= Buddhism amongst Tamils in Sri Lanka =

Tamil Buddhism in Sri Lanka
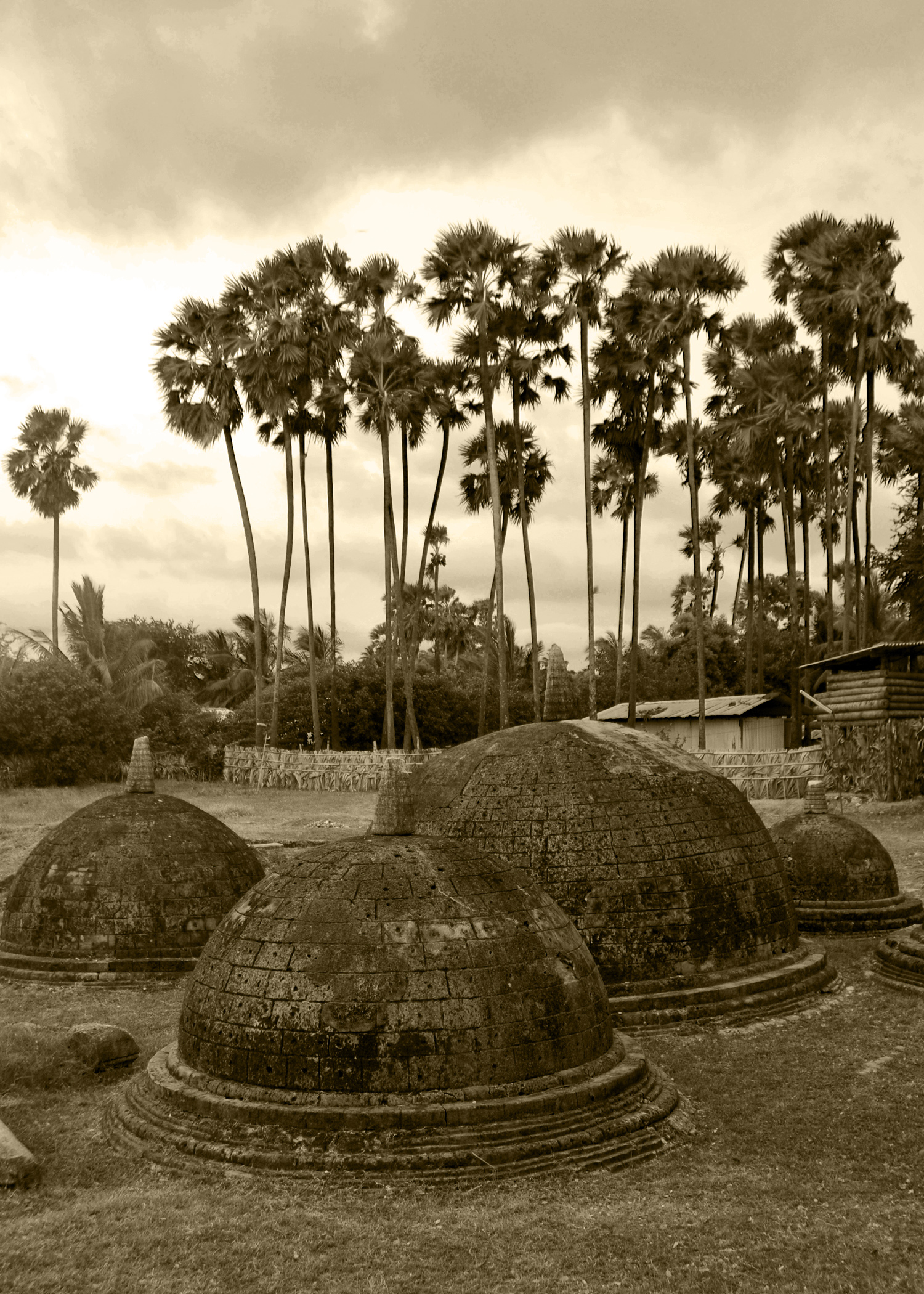
- 9th Century Buddhist Stupas of Kadurugoda Vihara in Kandarodai, Jaffna Peninsula.

Total population
- 22,254 (2012)

Religions
- Theravada Buddhism

Languages
- Tamil (native); English; Sinhala

Buddhism is the majority religion of Sri Lanka. In the past Buddhism was prominent among Tamils in Sri Lanka, just as Buddhism was elsewhere in the Indian Subcontinent, However most Sri Lankan Tamils today are Hindu and most Sinhalese practice Buddhism.

== History ==
The Tamil majority towns of Jaffna and Trincomalee are considered important town in the Sri Lankan Theravada Buddhist pantheon.

=== Jaffna peninsula ===
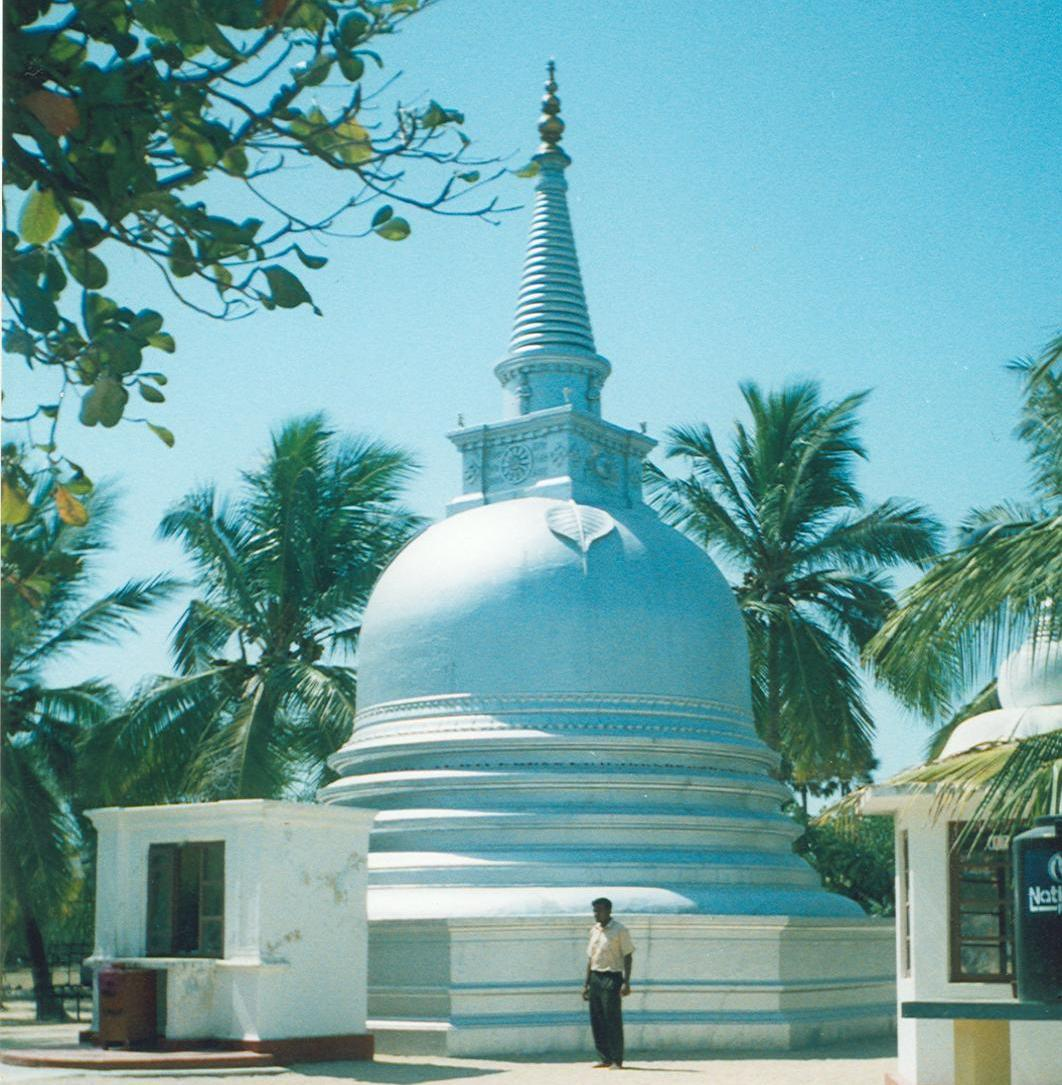
The Ancient Nagadeepa Purana Viharaya, near the Nagapooshani Amman Kovil, Nainativu

Nāga Tivu/ Nāga Natu was the name of the whole Jaffna Peninsula in some historical documents. There are number of Buddhist myths associated with the interactions of people of this historical place with Buddha. This Nagadeepa Purana Viharaya was located close to the ancient Nainativu Nagapooshani Amman Temple of Nainativu, one of the Shakta pithas. The word Naga was sometimes written in early inscriptions as Nāya, as in Nāganika - this occurs in the Nanaghat inscription of 150 BCE.

The famous Vallipuram Buddha statue built with Dravidian sculptural traditions from the Amaravati school was found in excavations below the Hindu temple. The language of the inscription is Prakrit, which shares several similarities with script inscriptions used in Andhra at the time, when the Telugu Satavahana dynasty was at the height of its power and its 17th monarch Hāla (20-24 CE) married a princess from the island. Peter Schalk writes, "Vallipuram has very rich archaeological remains that point at an early settlement. It was probably an emporium in the first centuries AD. […] From already dated stones with which we compare this Vallipuram statue, we can conclude that it falls in the period 3-4 century AD. During that period, the typical Amaravati-Buddha sculpture was developed." The Buddha statue found here was given to King of Thailand by the then British Governor Henry Blake in 1906.

Indrapala argued for a flourishing pre-Christian Buddhist civilization in Jaffna, in agreement with Paranavithana, and Mudliyar C. Rasanayakam, Ancient Jaffna in an earlier work, 1965.

This place is similar to Nagapatnam where all Asian vessels used it as a stopover point and the Buddhist and Hindu Stupas are just a resting and worshipping places for the sailors and international traders. .

A group of Stupas situated close together at the Kadurugoda Vihara site in Kandarodai served as a monastery for monks and reflect the rise in popularity of Mahayana Buddhism amongst Jaffna Tamils and the Tamils of the ancient Tamil country in the first few centuries of the common era before the revivalism of Hinduism amongst the population.

=== Trincomalee ===
Thiriyai is referred to as Talacori in the 2nd century CE map of Ptolemy. Thiriyai formed a prominent village of Jaffna's Vannimai districts in the medieval period.

The Chola Dynasty patronized several religions amongst Tamils, including Saivism, Vaishnavism, and Buddhism. They built Buddhist temples known as "Perrumpallis". In the eleventh century the Velgam Vehera of Periyakulam was renovated and renamed by the Cholas as Rajarajaperumpalli after they conquered the Anuradhapura and established their rule in Polonnaruwa. Tamil inscriptions excavated from this site point to the attention the Cholas paid to the development of Trincomalee District as a strong Saiva Tamil principality and for their contributions to the upkeep of several shrines including the monumental Shiva Koneswaram temple of Trincomalee.

=== Kingdom of Jaffna ===
The early Kings of Jaffna, King Chandrabhanu and King Savakanmaindan were Buddhists, however they were ethnically Javanese. Chandrabhanu being an invader from Tambaralinga and Savakanmaindan being his successor.

== Inscriptions ==
There are inscriptions found throughout Sri Lanka from the early Anuradhapura Period (300BC to 300AD) to the transition period of Sri Lanka (1216 - 1619) mentioning Tamil Buddhist devotees donations and contributions to Buddhist Temples.

=== Vēḷaikkārar Sanskrit Buddhist inscription of Padaviya ===
This latest inscription was a inscription issued in Padaviya under the reign of the Arya Chakravarti dynasty (Setu family) in the late 13th century.

It records a Vihara being built in Padaviya by a Tamil Buddhist general named Lokanatha.

'The Setu family is established in the Buddha dharma, which is unblemished, exalted with many virtues and is adorned with the triple gems (Buddha, Dhamma and the Sangha).

This vihara, glorious with beauty and splendour, with its spire adorned with gems and caused to be built here at Sripati (grāma) by the general named Lokanātha, has been named after the (regiment of) Vēḷaikkārar and placed under their protection. Hail Prosperity.'

— Translated by S. Pathmanathan,

== Today ==
=== Demographics ===
The 2012 Sri Lanka Census revealed a Buddhist population of 22,254 amongst the Sri Lankan Tamil population, including eleven monks, accounting to roughly 1% of all Sri Lankan Tamils in Sri Lanka.

There are no prominent Sri Lankan Tamil in Sri Lanka that identifies as a buddhist, however Malaysian Tamil businessman Tatparanandam Ananda Krishnan, who had Jaffna Roots was a follower of Buddhism his son, Ven Ajahn Siripanyo is a Theravada Buddhist monk.

== See also ==
- Buddhism amongst Tamils
