= Idikundu =

Idikundu (Idi-kun-du), translates in Tamil to 'Thunder Well', is a natural water well in Navaly, Jaffna District, Sri Lanka. Legend says it was created by a lightning strike in the early 20th century; some speculate it might be an asteroid that struck.

The depth of this water well is so deep and it is unknown; it is also an unpopular location as some locals use this well to commit suicide. In the same Jaffna District, there is another natural water well in the suburb of Nilavarai.

== See also ==
- Casuarina Beach
- Keerimalai
- Kantharodai
- Nallur (Jaffna)
- Naguleswaram temple
- Nallur Kandaswamy Kovil
- Nainativu
- Neduntheevu
- Nilavarai
- Operation Plumbbob: The first nuclear-propelled manmade object in space?, also called a "Thunder well"
