= Casuarina Beach =

Beach in Sri Lanka

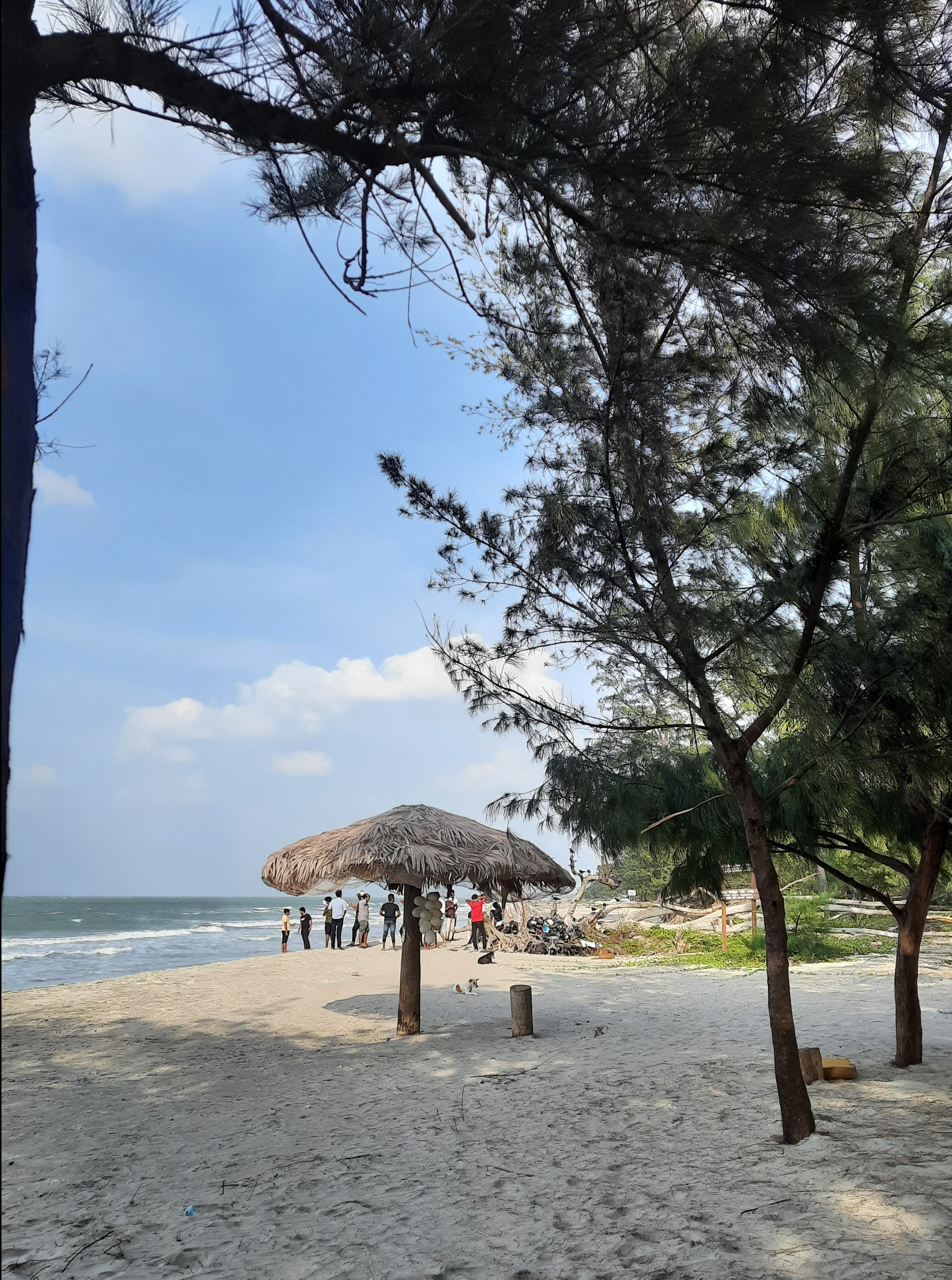
A view of Casuarina Beach in 2021

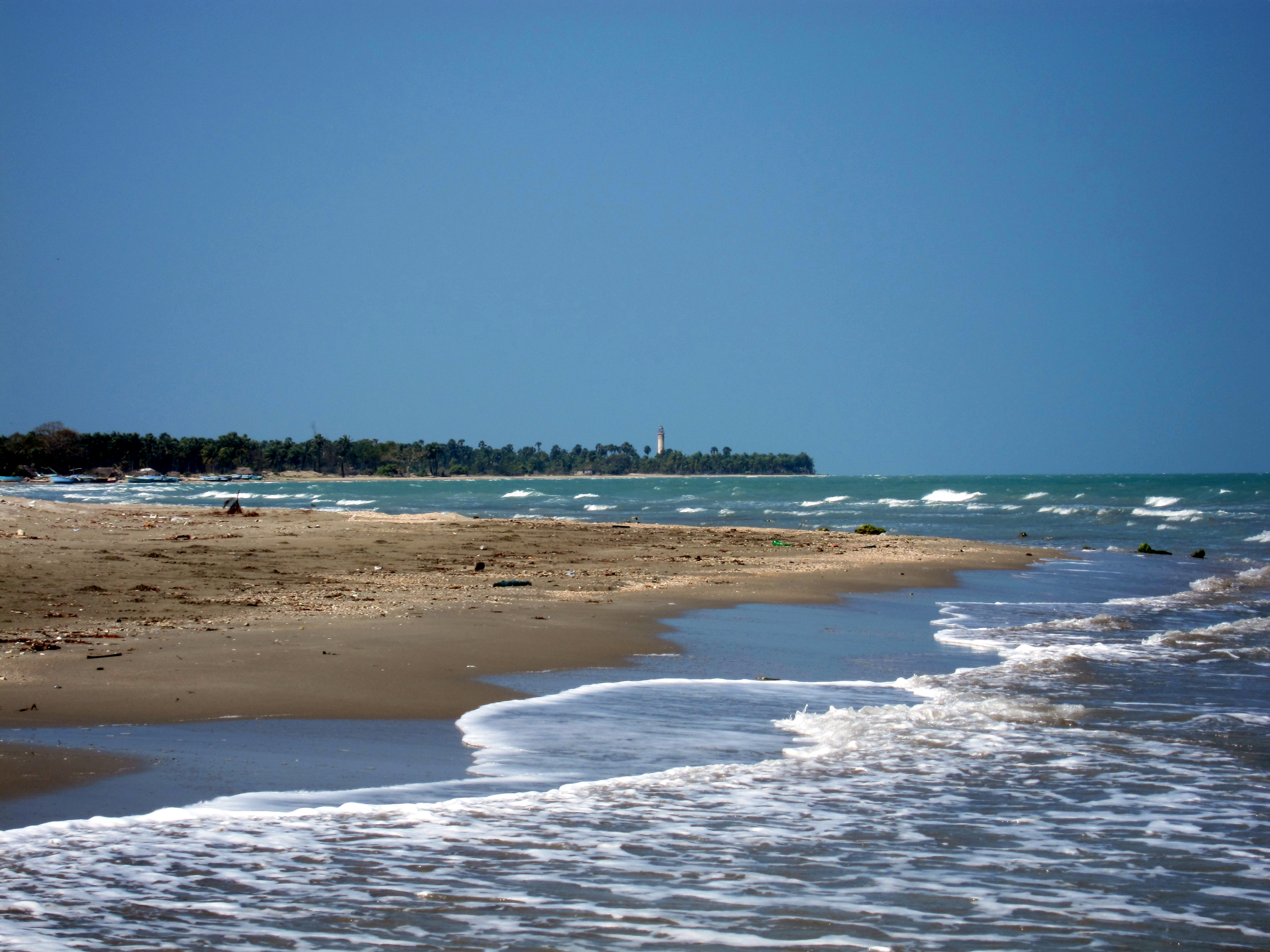
Casuarina Beach in 2011

Casuarina Beach (also Casoorina, Cashoorina) is in Karainagar, Jaffna District, Sri Lanka, about 20 kilometres (12 mi) from Jaffna. The 1.5 km long white sand beach is considered to be the best beach in the Jaffna Peninsula. The beach is named after the Casuarina trees that grow on the shore.

== See also ==
- Keerimalai
- Kantharodai
- Nallur (Jaffna)
- Naguleswaram temple
- Nallur Kandaswamy Kovil
- Nainativu
- Neduntheevu
- Nilavarai
- Idikundu
