= Nilavarai =

Nilavarai நிலாவரை නිලවරම
- Village
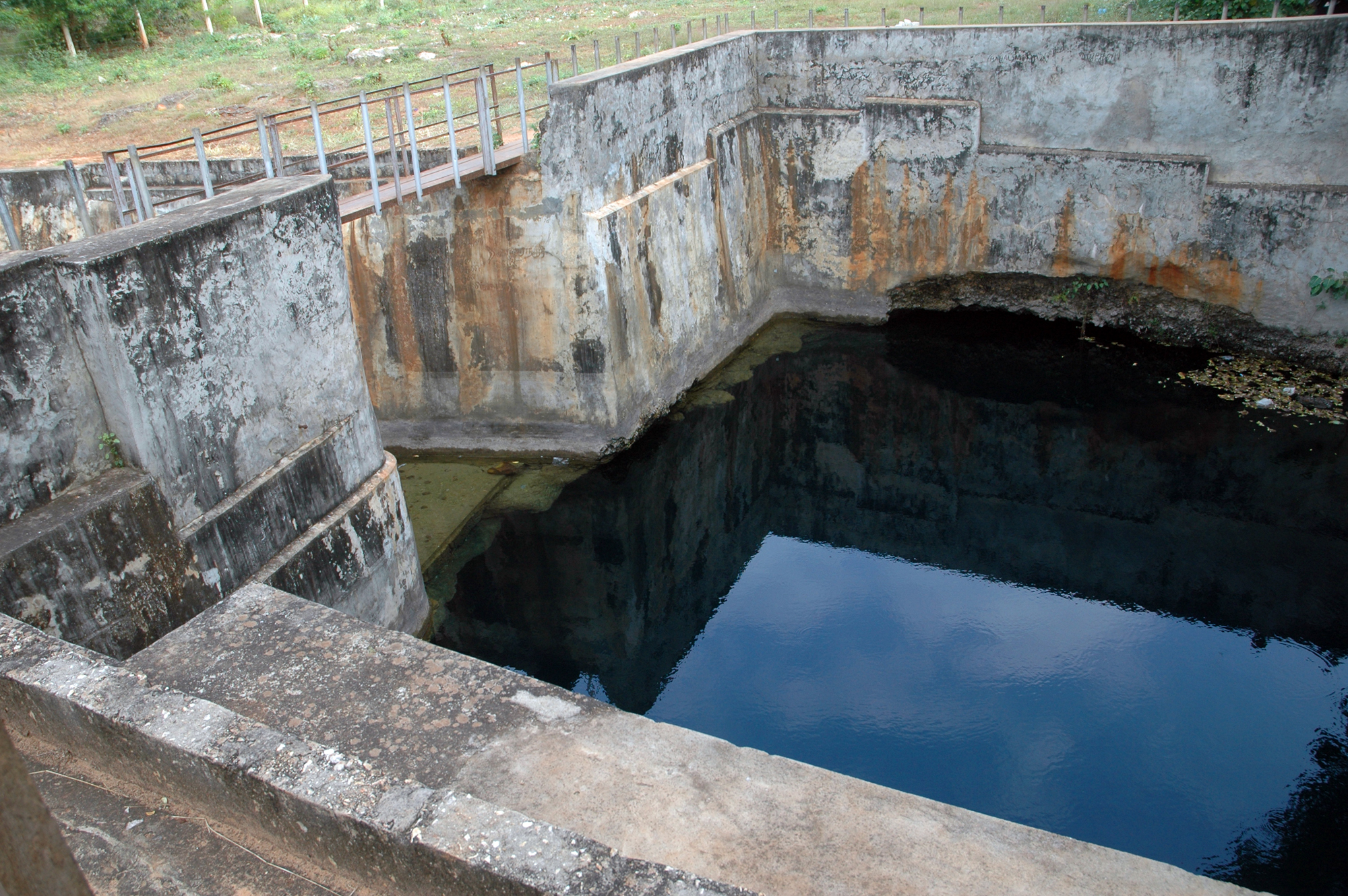
- Nilavarai, Natural underground water well

- Location within Northern Province
- Coordinates: 9°45′0″N 80°5′0″E
- Country: Sri Lanka
- Province: Northern
- District: Jaffna
- DS Division: Valikamam East

Nilavarai (Tamil: நிலாவரை, romanized: Nilāvarai) is a location in the Jaffna District, Sri Lanka. It is popular for a natural underground Water well (Called Nilavari Bottomless well) where the water never gets depleted and it serves the irrigation of the neighbouring fields. There is another natural Water well in the Jaffna District by the name Idikundu (Idi-kun-du).

== See also ==
- Casuarina Beach
- Keerimalai
- Kantharodai
- Nallur (Jaffna)
- Naguleswaram temple
- Nallur Kandaswamy Kovil
- Nainativu
- Neduntheevu
- Idikundu
