= Buddhism amongst Tamils =

Aspect of Tamil history

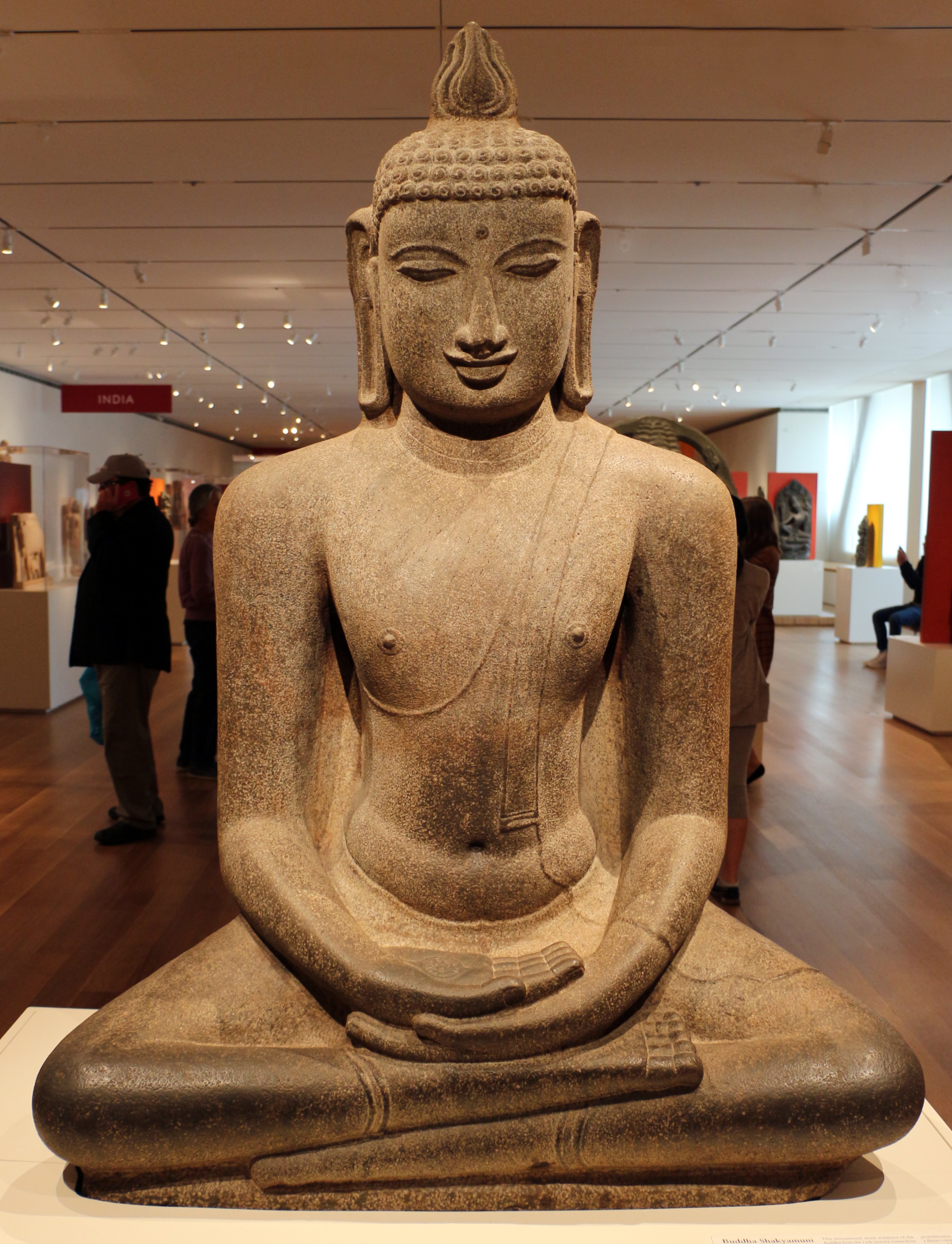
Buddha seated in lotus position, 11th century, Tamil Nadu.

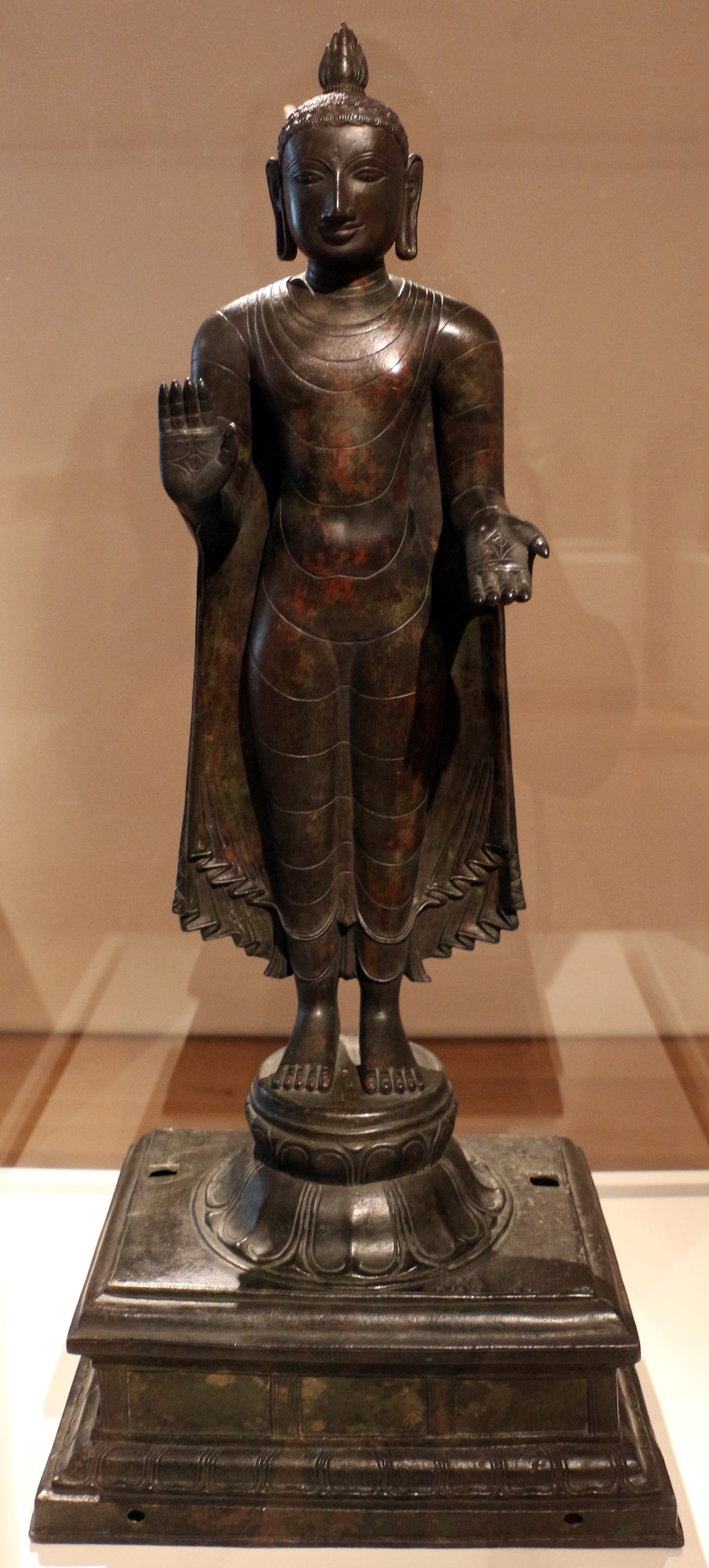
Buddha bronze, Chola period, 10th century.

Buddhism amongst the Tamils was historically found in the Tamilakam region of India and Sri Lanka.

== India ==
=== Origin ===
The heritage of the town of Nākappaṭṭinam is found in the Burmese historical text of the 3rd century BCE and gives evidence of a Budha Vihar built by the King Ashoka. An inscription from Anuradhapura, Sri Lanka dated to 2nd century BCE records the association of Tamil merchants with Buddhist institution.

Ancient ruins of a 4th-5th-century Buddhist monastery, a Buddha statue, and a Buddhapada (footprint of the Buddha) were found in another section of the ancient city, now at Pallavanesvaram.

Nāgappaṭṭinam was a Buddhist centre of the 4th-5th century CE. Its stupa dates from this era. Buddhism disappeared from this city as of an unknown date but was revived as of the 9th century. (H.P.Ray, The Winds of Change, Delhi 1994, p. 142) In the 11th century, Chudamani Vihara was built by the Javanese king Sri Vijaya Soolamanivarman with the patronage of Raja Raja Chola I. The "Animangalam Copperplate" of Kulothungachola notes that “Kasiba Thera” [Buddhist Monk] renovated the Buddhist temple in the 6th century with the help of Buddhist monks of "Naga Nadu". This "nagar annam vihar" later came to be known as "Nagananavigar". Buddhism flourished until the 15th century and the buildings of the vihara survived until the 18th century. Kanchipuram is one of the oldest cities in South India, and was a city of learning for Tamil, Sanskrit, and Pali and was believed to be visited by Xuanzang. He visited the city in the 7th century and said that this city was 6 miles in circumference and that its people were famous for bravery and piety as well as for their love of justice and veneration for learning. He further recorded that Gautama Buddha had visited the place. It was during the reign of the Pallava dynasty from the 4th to the 9th centuries that Kanchipuram attained its limelight. The city served as the Pallava capital, and many of the known temples were built during their reign. According to Tamil tradition, the founder of Zen, Bodhidharma was born here. (Note: Little contemporary biographical information on Bodhidharma is extant, and subsequent accounts became layered with legend. There are three principal sources for Bodhidharma's biography. None of them mentions specifically Tamil Nadu, only "the western regions" and "Souther India". See Bodhidharma#Birthplace sources for an extensive overview of possible origins, and the reliability of the sources provided for these possible origins.)

In the 8th century CE, Buddhist monk Vajrabodhi, the son of a Tamil aristocrat, travelled from Tamil Nadu to the Tang capital of Chang'an, via Sri Lanka and Srivijaya, after mastering the art of Tantric Buddhism. He took a plethora of new theological beliefs to a China that was largely following Confucianism or Daoism. Vajrabodhi's contribution to the growth of Tantric Buddhism in China has been recorded by one of his lay disciples, Lü Xiang.

== Literature ==
Various scholarly works dating back to the 2nd century common era saw the birth of classical Tamil works composed by eminent Tamil poets with Buddhist philosophical themes and insights illustrate the impact that Buddhism had in the world of Tamil scholarship. One of the classical products of that period is the ancient Tamil Buddhist epic-poem Manimekalai by the celebrated poet Chithalai Chathanar is set in the town of Kaveripattanam.

== Tamil Buddhist historical figures ==
- Bodhisena - Buddhist scholar notable for travelling to Japan
- Buddhadatta - 5th-century Theravada Buddhist writer
- Dhammapāla - Theravada Buddhist commentator believed to have lived at Badara Tittha Vihara
- Dignāga - 6th-century Buddhist scholar and one of the founders of the Buddhist school of logic Pramāṇa-samuccaya
- Vajrabodhi - Esoteric Buddhist monk and one of the 8 patriarchs of Shingon Buddhism who according to some theories, came from what is now Tamilakam. Also associated with the Nalanda monastery in Bihar

== Thalaivetti Muniappan Buddhist Temple ==
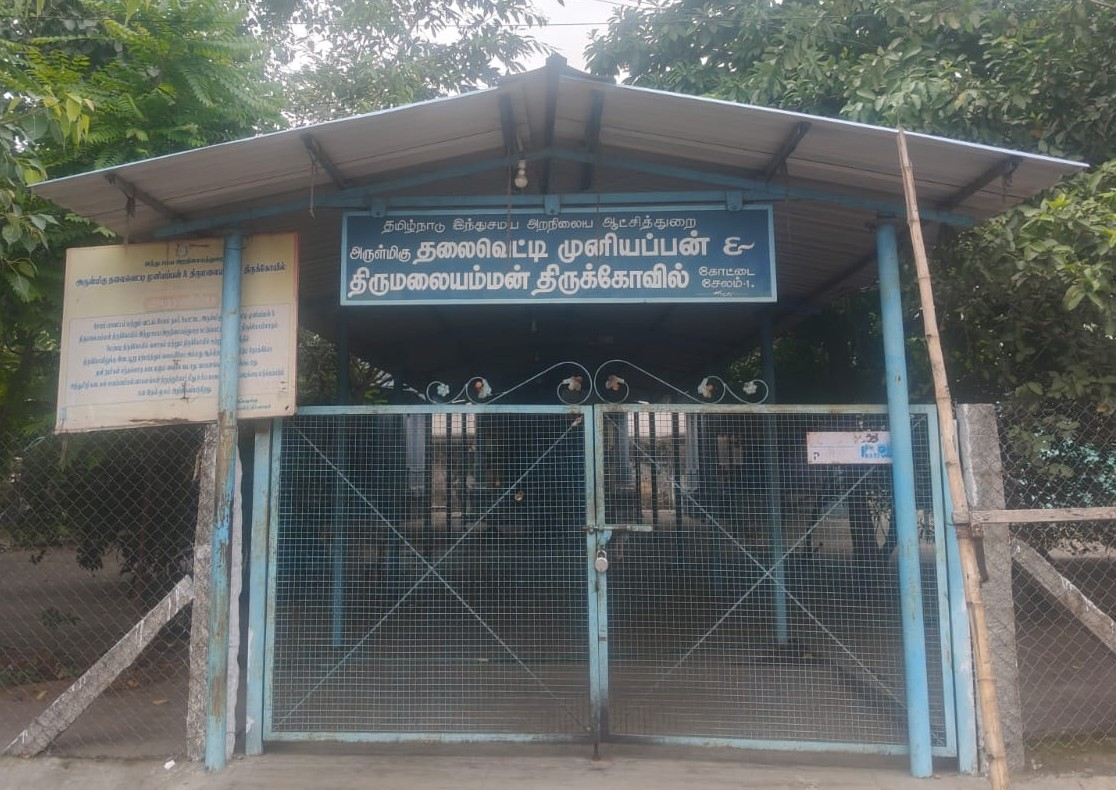
Thalaivetti Muniappan Temple

The Madras High Court was hearing a plea by the Buddha Trust in Salem, which said that the idol was originally that of the Buddha, but over time it was taken over and was worshipped as that of Thalaivetti Munniappan. The Madras High Court has declared that the statue of the main deity at a temple in Salem district is that of Buddha and not a Hindu deity. The idol in the temple is currently being worshipped as Thalaivetti Muniappan. The High Court was hearing a plea by Buddha Trust, based in Salem, who had filed a petition in 2017 saying that the idol is of the Buddha. Taking cognisance of a report filed by the state archaeological department that a preliminary inspection has revealed that the statue of the Buddha, Justice N Anand Venkatesh has ruled that the idol is indeed originally that of the Buddha.

== See also ==
- Buddhism amongst Tamils in Sri Lanka
- Buddhaghosa
- Dhammapāla
- Manimekalai
- Kundalakesi
- Sri Lanka Maha Bodhi Centre, Chennai

== Sources ==
- Dumoulin, Heinrich; Heisig, James; Knitter, Paul F. (2005). Zen Buddhism: India and China. World Wisdom, Inc. ISBN 978-0-941532-89-1.
- Kambe, Tstuomu (2008), Bodhidharma. A collection of stories from Chinese literature (PDF), archived from the original (PDF) on 6 November 2015
- McRae, John R. (2000), "The Antecedents of Encounter Dialogue in Chinese Ch'an Buddhism", in Heine, Steven; Wright, Dale S. (eds.), The Kōan: Texts and Contexts in Zen Buddhism, Oxford University Press
- McRae, John (2003), Seeing Through Zen. Encounter, Transformation, and Genealogy in Chinese Chan Buddhism, The University Press Group Ltd, ISBN 978-0-520-23798-8
- Zvelebil, Kamil V. (1987), "The Sound of the One Hand", Journal of the American Oriental Society, 107 (1), Journal of the American Oriental Society, Vol. 107, No. 1: 125–126, doi:10.2307/602960, JSTOR 602960
