= Taprobana =

Ancient Greek name for Sri Lanka

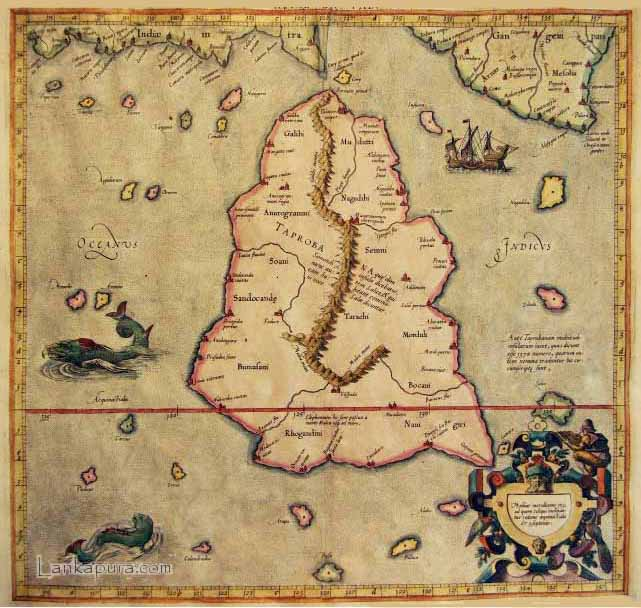
Ptolemy's Taprobane

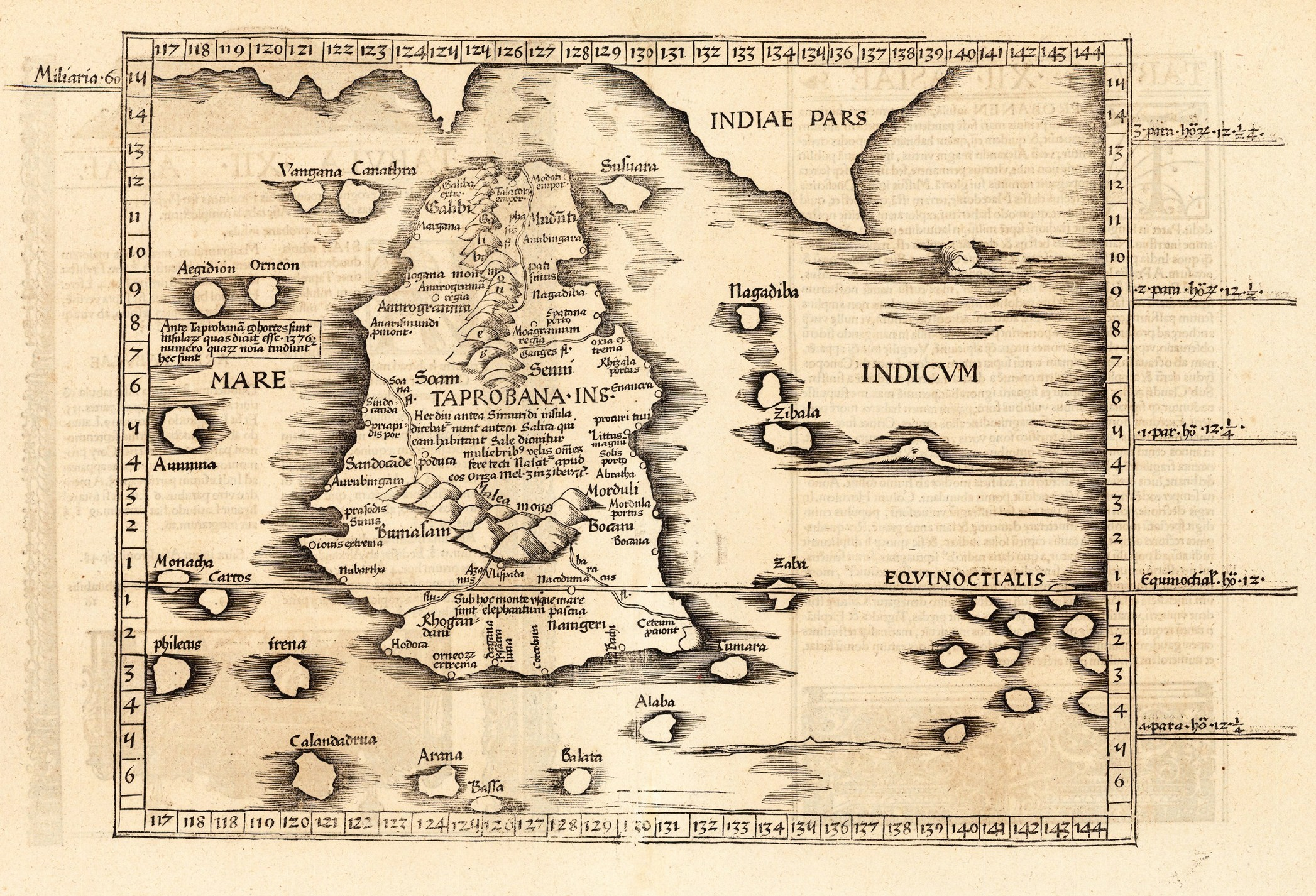
Ptolemy's Taprobana as published in Cosmographia Claudii Ptolomaei Alexandrini, 1535

Taprobana (Latin: Taprobana; Ancient Greek: Ταπροβανᾶ;Tamil: Thamirabharani;), Taprobana, and Taprobané (Ταπροβανῆ, Ταπροβάνη) was the name by which the Indian Ocean island of Sri Lanka was known to the ancient Greeks.

Tabrobane is suggested to be derived from Prakrit and Pali "Tambapanni"., where the Sanskrit form of it is "Tamraparni". This name could be a reference to the "copper coloured" shores of Sri Lanka, connected to its civilisational origin story of Prince Vijaya and his followers, later forming the Sinhalese Kingdoms. The Ashokan edicts of his missionary activities also refers to the island by the name "Tambapanni".

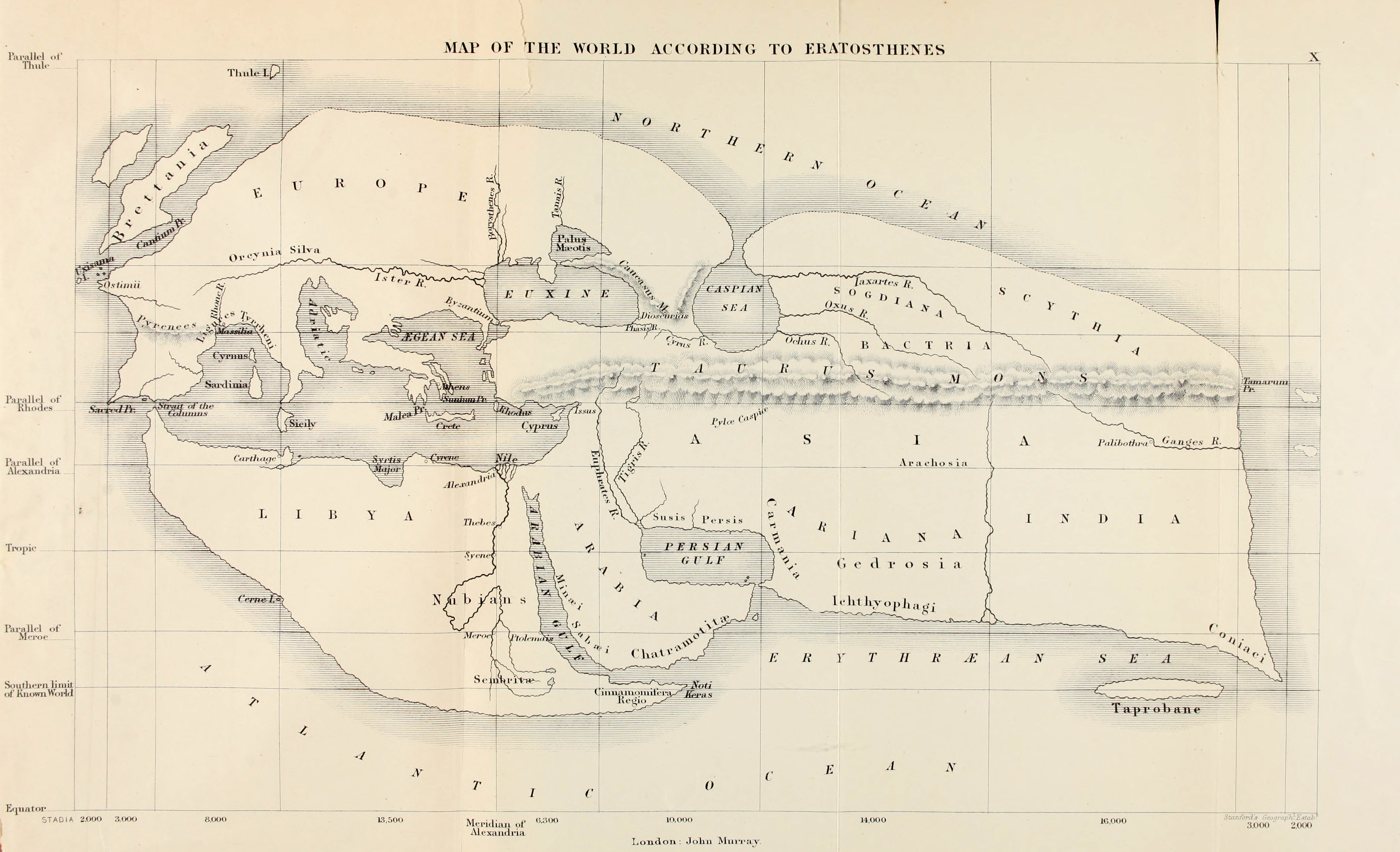
19th-century reconstruction of Eratosthenes' map of the (for the Greeks) known world, c. 194 BC

== History ==
Reports of the island's existence were known before the time of Alexander the Great as inferred from Pliny. The treatise De Mundo, supposedly by Aristotle (died 322 BC) but according to others by Chrysippus the Stoic (280 to 208 BC), incorrectly states that the island is as large as Great Britain (in fact, it is only about one third as big). The name was first reported to Europeans by the Greek geographer Megasthenes around 290 BC. Herodotus (444 BC) does not mention the island. The first Geography in which it appears is that of Eratosthenes (276 to 196 BC) and was later adopted by Claudius Ptolemy (139 AD) in his geographical treatise to identify a relatively large island south of continental Asia. Writing during the era of Augustus, Greek geographer Strabo makes reference to the island, noting that "Taprobane sends great amounts of ivory, tortoise-shell and other merchandise to the markets of India.". Eratosthenes' map of the (for the Greeks) known world, c. 194 BC also shows the island south of India called Taprobane.

Stephanus of Byzantium writes that a metropolis of the island was called Argyra (Ancient Greek: Ἀργυρᾶ, "Silver") and that also there was a river which was called Phasis (Ancient Greek: Φᾶσις).

Aelian writes that he had heard that the island does not have cities, but 750 villages.

The identity of Ptolemy's Taprobane has been always associated with the present day Sri Lanka from maps of ancient antiquity until the medieval maps of Abu-Rehan (1030) and Edrisi (1154) and in the writing of Marco Polo (1292). Furthermore, most of the place names marked on the map can be identified with place name of the places in ancient Sri Lanka.

- Talakori port - Jambukolapaṭṭana (Prakrit), Dambakola Patuna (Sinhalese)
- Margana Port - from Mannārama port (Sinhalese), currently known as Manthai
- Bokana Port - Gokanna port (Prakrit and Sinhalese), presently known as Trincomalee,
- Anourogrammoi - from Anur̄adhagrāma (Sinhalese), which later became Anuradhapura (Sinhalese)
- Korkobara Port - from the Godawaya port (Sinhalese)
- Rogondanai Region - from the Rōhaṇa region (Sinhalese)

Also, the relative position of the island in comparison to India, being centrally situated on the Indian Ocean trade route and a major trading center for trade in elephants and golden spice as described by ancient Greek and Roman travelers, further validate the assignment of the name to Sri Lanka.

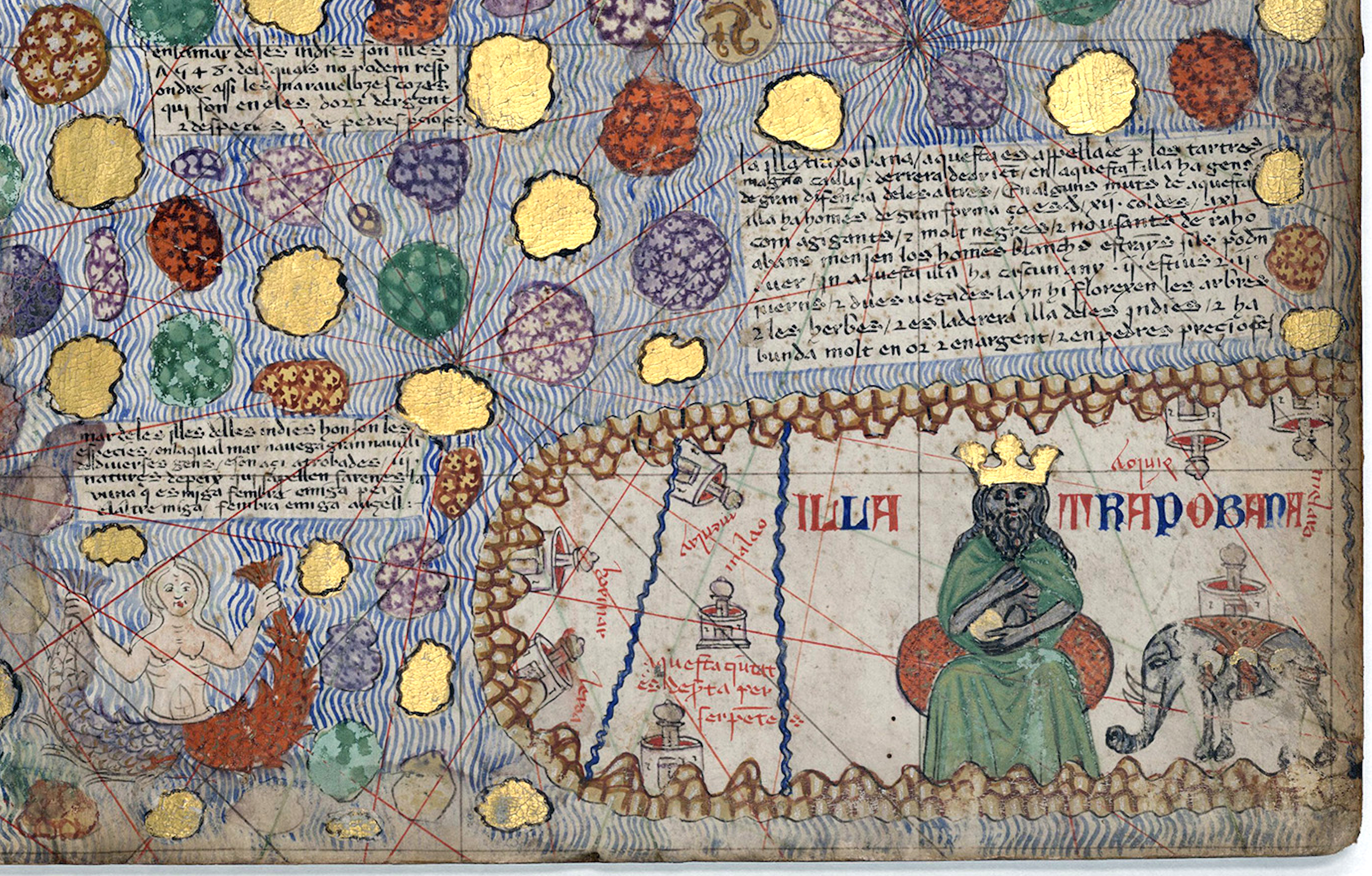
Taprobane in the Catalan Atlas (1375): "Illa Trapobana".

However, on the maps of the Middle Ages, the fashion of using Latinised names and delineating places with fanciful figures contributed to absurd designs and confusion regarding the actual place of Taprobane. In the fifteenth century, Niccolò de' Conti mistakenly identified Taprobana as a much smaller island. In 1507, Martin Waldseemuller still assigned Taprobana to Sri Lanka. Sebastian Munster's 1580 map identified Taprobana as Sumatra, where the German title, Sumatra Ein Grosse Insel, means, "Sumatra, a large island". Munster's map created a debate on the identity of Taprobane. Due to this debate following possibilities were considered valid for Taprobana in the Middle Ages:

- Sri Lanka, as in Ptolemy's map and climes
- Sumatra, as in the birthplace of Enrique of Malacca
- A phantom island

However, this issue was resolved with the rediscovery of Ptolemy's work in the 1400s. Ptolemy's map had been lost since the time of its production around the 2nd century AD. However, copies were rediscovered in the Middle East around 1400 AD. Moreover, by that time, the Portuguese had made their way into Asia. They had knowledge of both Sri Lanka (then Ceylan) and Sumatra from at least 80 years before. Munster apparently based his identification of Taprobane with Sumatra on 16th-century knowledge. Therefore, it can be mostly believed that this one-off identification of Taprobane with Sumatra was possible due to misassignment.

== In media ==
Taprobana is mentioned in the first strophe of the Portuguese epic poem Os Lusíadas by Luís de Camões (c. 1524 – 10 June 1580).

As armas e os barões assinalados,
Que da ocidental praia Lusitana,
Por mares nunca de antes navegados,
Passaram ainda além da Taprobana,
Em perigos e guerras esforçados,
Mais do que prometia a força humana,
E entre gente remota edificaram
Novo Reino, que tanto sublimaram

"The armed and noble barons, of the western shores of Portugal, Through seas never sailed before, They passed beyond Taprobana, In dangers and difficult wars, showing more than the usual human strength, Among remote people they built New Kingdom, which is quite heavenly."

In literary works, Taprobana was mentioned in Tommaso Campanella's The City of the Sun, written in 1602. Jorge Luis Borges mentions the island in the story The Lottery in Babylon in the collection The Garden of Forking Paths (1941) of his book Fictions (1944). Toprobana is the fictional location of the sky elevator in Arthur C. Clarke's science fiction novel The Fountains of Paradise (1979). British rock band My Vitriol's 2001 debut album Finelines features a track called Taprobane, courtesy of the band's lead singer Som Wardner who is of Sri Lankan origin. In Miguel de Cervantes’ novel Don Quixote, the titular protagonist mistakes a drove of sheep for an army from Taprobana.

== See also ==
- Names of Sri Lanka
- Waldseemüller map
