= Ukkirasinghan =

8th c. king of the Jaffna kingdom (today Sri Lanka)

Ukkirasinghan (Tamil: உக்கிரசிங்கன், romanized: Ukkiraciṅkaṉ, also spelled Ugra Singan) was an early king of the Jaffna Peninsula of the 8th century CE, who established his capital at Kandarodai, formerly known as Kadiramalai. According to Yalpana Vaipava Malai, Ukkirasinghan was from the dynasty of Prince Vijaya. He was married to Chola princess Maruta Piravika Valli (daughter of Thisai Ukkira Cholan) described as cursed to be born with the face of a horse who visited one of the Pancha Ishwarams, the Naguleswaram temple at Keerimalai to free herself from the curse.

== See also ==
- Maviddapuram
