= Ancient Kadurugoda Viharaya =

Ancient Kadurugoda Vihara Historical Site
- පුරාණ කදුරුගොඩ විහාරය; பண்டைய கதுருகொட விகாரை
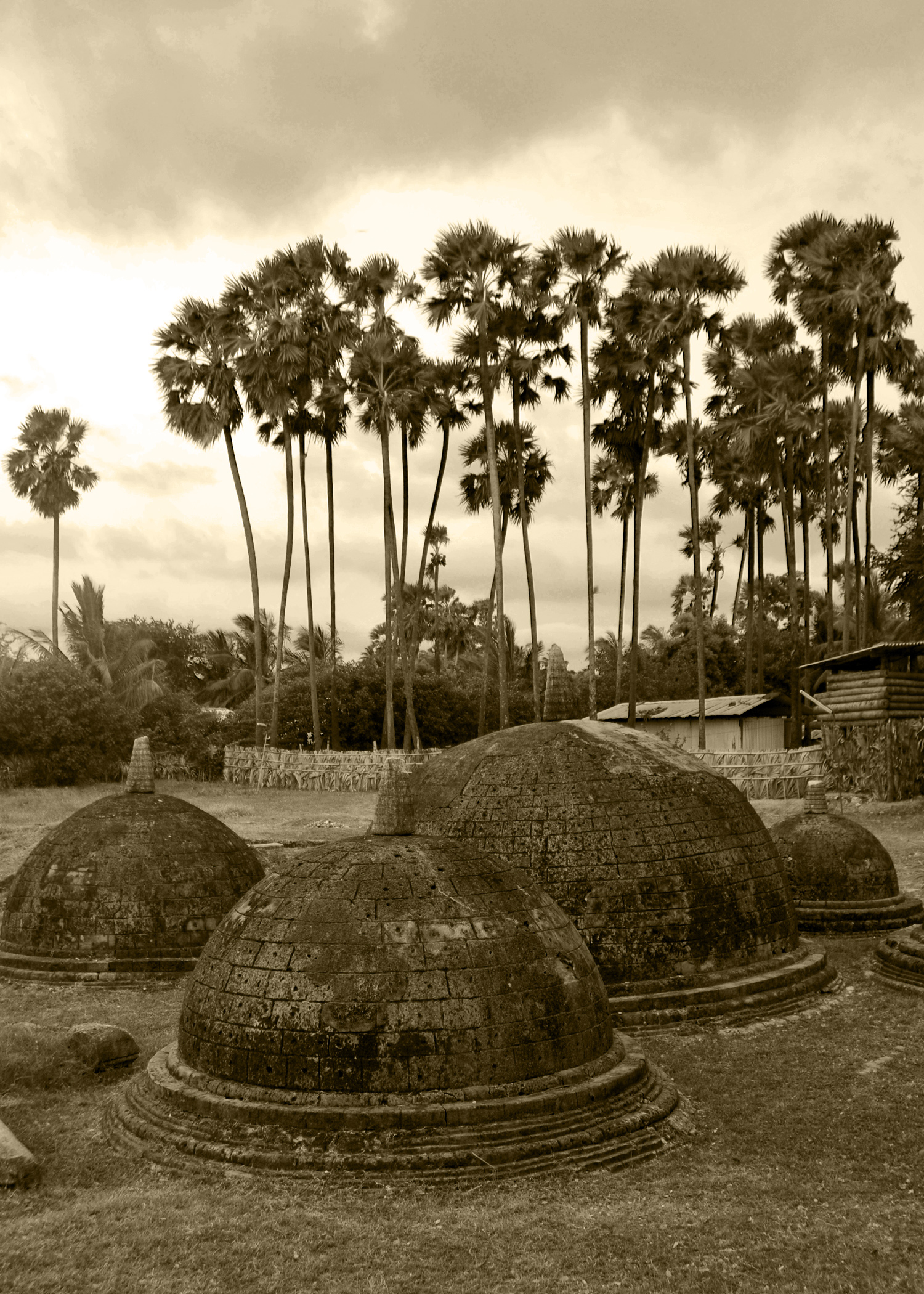

Religion
- Affiliation: Buddhism
- District: Jaffna
- Province: Northern Province

Location
- Location: Chunnakam, Sri Lanka
- Interactive map of Ancient Kadurugoda Vihara Historical Site
- Coordinates: 09°45′N 80°01′E

Architecture
- Type: Buddhist stupa
- Archaeological Protected Monument of Sri Lanka
- Designated: 13.05.2013

Ancient Kantharodai Historical Site with some remains of Stupas is situated in Kandarodai village in Chunnakam, Sri Lanka. The temple is considered one of the ancient Buddhist remains in existence today in Jaffna Peninsula.

== History ==
According to Mahavamsa the history of Kantharodai Buddhist Monastery goes back to the Anuradhapura era. During the time period of King Devanpiya Thissa, Theri Sangamitta arrived to Dambakolapatuna in Sri Lanka with a sapling of Sri Maha Bodhi. It is said that the road to Anuradhapura from Dambakolapatuna was through this Kadurugoda Vihara area and before going to Anuradhapura she has visited this temple.

In 1981, a stone pillar belonging to the reign of King Dappula IV (923-935 A.D.), the inscription contains a regal proclamation of the bequest of gifts and benefits made to a Buddhist place of worship. This inscription is presently placed in the Jaffna Archaeological Museum.

This temple is referred to in 'Nampotha', a book compiled during the 15th century, as Kadurugoda Viharaya of the Demalapattanama.

== Folklores ==
There are few folklores which reveal some stories related to this Kadurugoda Vihara. According to one legend, in the 16th century, Jaffna Peninsula was ruled by a king named Sangili. At that time there were 60 Arhat Bhikkus practicing meditation. Due to harassment from King Sangili, those 60 Bhikkus decided to leave Jaffna and go to India. On their way, they had stayed at the Kadurugoda area to accept alms-giving from local residents. A mushroom curry served to them was poisoned and all of the Bhikkus had died. It is believed that these stupas were constructed with enshrining the relics of those 60 Arhath Bhikkus. Another story says that the 60 Arhath Bhikkus had died due to a famine, which was there for a long time.

== Excavations ==
In 1917 remains of several Buddhist ruins were found at Kandarodai by then Jaffna District Magistrate Paul E. Pieris which was identified as the ancient Kadurugoda Vihara. He reported about 56 stupas in the area but at present only about 20 stupas can be seen. Through the excavations on that period, the ruins of a shrine room, coloured tiles, parts of Buddha and Bodhisattva statues, Buddha foot imprints, a guard stone with Punkalasa and ancient coins belonging to 1st Parakumba, Malla, Leelawathi and Buwenakabahu's time were found in the site. Some of them were preserved at the Jaffna museum.

== Features ==
Today there are about 20 stupas and a number of stupa foundations can be seen in the Vihara premises. The smallest stupa is about 8 feet in diameter and the largest is about 23.5 feet. The stupas possess unique features that cannot be found anywhere else in Sri Lanka. They have been made of gray colored coral stone and have a very distinguished pattern with small holes all over them. Another special feature of these ancient stupas is that they do not possess the standard square shape parts (Hathares Kotuwa and Dewatha Kotuwa) above the dome and instead they have umbrella shaped fixed pinnacles.

== Present ==
In 1948 the archaeology department purchased seven acres around this area to preserve this site. But due to land occupation by local residents, the area had been reduced to about three acres in 1965. Currently the land has been reduced into less than one acre.

Currently this temple has been declared as an archaeological site in Sri Lanka and is maintained by the Sri Lankan army.

== See also ==
- Nagadeepa Purana Vihara
