= Dhammapāla =

Name of two or more great Theravada Buddhist commentators

Dhammapāla was the name of two or more great Theravada Buddhist commentators.

The earlier, born in Kanchipuram, is known to us from both the Gandhavamsa and the writings of Xuanzang to have lived at Badara Tittha Vihara south of modern Chennai, and to have written the commentaries on seven of the shorter canonical books (consisting almost entirely of verses) and also the commentary on the Netti, perhaps the oldest Pali work outside the canon. Extracts from the latter work, and the whole of three out of the seven others, have been published in Pali by the Pali Text Society. These works show great learning, exegetical skill and sound judgment. But as to the meaning of words, or to discussions of the ethical import of his texts, very little can be gathered from his writings of value for the social history of his time. Though in all probability a Tamil by birth, he declares, in the opening lines of those of his works that have been edited, that he followed the tradition of the Great Monastery (Maha Vihara) at Anuradhapura in Sri Lanka, and the works themselves confirm this in every respect.

Another writer, probably also called Dhammapala, since he was supposed by the 12th century to be the same, though scholars do not accept this, wrote subcommentaries on the commentaries on the Digha, Majjhima and Samyutta Nikayas.

A third Dhammapala wrote Saccasankhepa, a handbook of abhidhamma.

== Sources ==
- Edmund Hardy in Zeitschrift der deutschen morgenlandischen Gesellschaft (1898), pp. 97 foll.
- Netti-ppakaranam: The guide, according to Kaccana Thera (ed. E. Hardy, London, Pali Text Society, 1902, ASIN B0000CLJ95), especially the Introduction, passim
- Theri Gatha Commentary, Peta Vatthu Commentary, and Vimna Vutthu Commentary, all three published by the Pali Text Society.
- K.R. Norman, Pali Literature, Otto Harrassowitz, Wiesbaden, 1983
- Oskar von Hinüber, Handbook of Pali Literature, Walter de Gruyter, Berlin, 1996
