= Navaly =

Navaly நவாலி නවලි
- Town
- Location within Northern Province
- Coordinates: 09°42′55″N 79°59′05″E
- Country: Sri Lanka
- Province: Northern
- District: Jaffna
- DS Division: Valikamam South‐West

Navaly (Tamil: நவாலி ; Sinhala: නවලි), also transliterated as Navali, Navaaly or Navaali is a town in the Jaffna District of Sri Lanka and it is located about 6 km from Jaffna, in the northwest of the peninsula of the same name. There are many famous places in the town, for example: Navaly kalaiyoodai amman koovil, St. Peter's Church. Nearly 1500 people live there.

On 9 July 1995, during the Sri Lankan Civil War, the village church was bombed by the Sri Lankan Air Force. It is estimated that 125 civilians were killed.

Navaly is divided into three sections:

1. Navaly East
2. Navaly North
3. Navaly South

== See also ==
- Idikundu
