= Skandavarodaya College =

Skandavarodaya College Kandarodai

Location
- Kandarodai, Jaffna District, Northern Province; Sri Lanka
- Coordinates: 9.7534°N 80.0092°E

Information
- Type: Public provincial
- Motto: உண்மையே உயர் அறம் (Truthness is the highest morality)
- Established: 1894
- Authority: Northern Provincial Council
- principal: M. Selvasthan
- Grades: 6-13
- Gender: Mixed
- Age range: 11-18

Skandavarodaya College (Skantha Varodaya College) is a provincial school in Kandarodai, Jaffna District, Sri Lanka.

== See also ==
- List of schools in Northern Province, Sri Lanka
- Kantharodai Tamil Kandaiya Vidyasalai
