= Badaratittha =

Badara Tittha Vihara (also Badaratittha, Padaratittha) is the name of a historic Theravada Buddhist vihara in what is now the modern Tamil Nadu state of India.

== In the Gandhavamsa ==
Badaratittha is known to us from the Gandhavamsa (or Cullagandhavamsa), a 17th-century Pali work by Nandapañña that recounts post-canonical Pali books written in Burma and Ceylon.

The Gandhavamsa states that Badara Tittha Vihara was the dwelling place of Ācariya Dhammapāla, an early Theravadin commentator from Kanchipuram.
