= Kantharodai Tamil Kandaiya Vidyasalai =

Location
- Kandarodai, Jaffna District, Northern Province; Sri Lanka
- Coordinates: 9.7534°N 80.0092°E

Information
- Type: Public provincial
- Motto: யாதும் ஊரே யாவரும் கேளிர் (Every Village is our Village; Every Person is our Relative)
- Established: 1893
- Authority: Northern Provincial Council
- Grades: 1-11
- Gender: Mixed
- Age range: 5-16
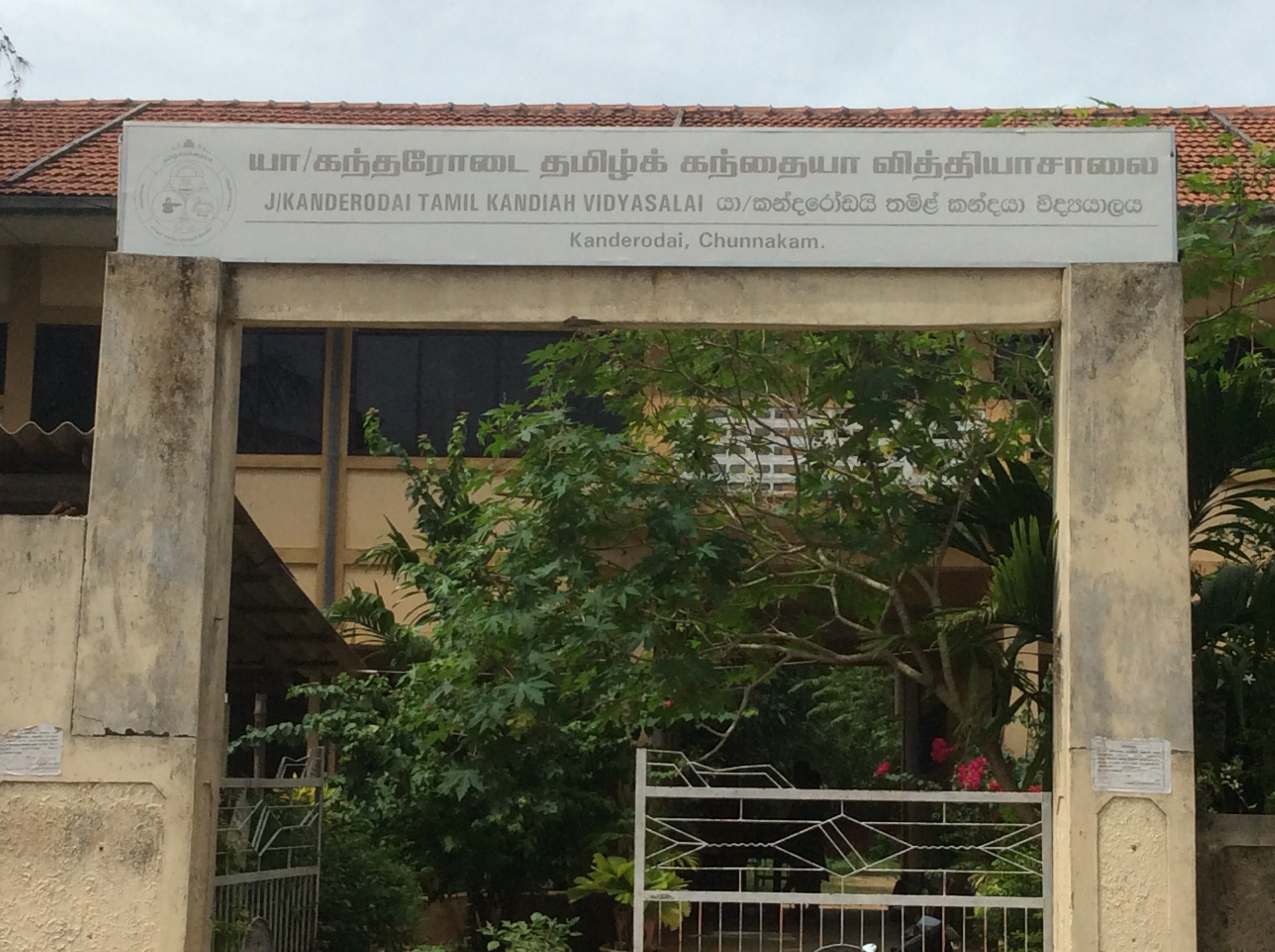
- Front view of Kantharodai Tamil Kandaiya Vidyasalai

Kantharodai Tamil Kandaiya Vidyasalai is a provincial school in Kandarodai, Jaffna District, Sri Lanka.

== See also ==
- List of schools in Northern Province, Sri Lanka
- Skandavarodaya College
