= Navaly church bombing =

Air Force attack in Sri Lankan Civil War

- Location: 09°42′40″N 79°59′16″E; Navaly, Sri Lanka
- Date: 9 July 1995 (+6 GMT)
- Target: Sri Lankan Tamils
- Attack type: Aerial bombardment
- Weapon: Bomb
- Deaths: 147-300
- Injuries: Unknown but many
- Perpetrator: Sri Lankan Air Force

The Church of Saint Peter and Saint Paul in Navaly (or Navali) in the Jaffna Peninsula was bombed by the Sri Lankan Air Force during the Sri Lankan Civil War on 9 July 1995. It is estimated that at least 147 Tamil civilians, who had taken refuge from the fighting inside the church, died as a result of the bombing. The victims included men, women and children.

== Background ==
On 19 April 1995, the LTTE broke the ongoing cease-fire and blew up two gunboats, SLNS Sooraya and SLNS Ranasuru of the Sri Lanka Navy thereby beginning the next phase of the Sri Lankan Civil War. On 9 July 1995, the government forces launched Operation Leap Forward, which was the first stage of an offensive to retake the Jaffna Peninsula. This operation was already highlighted by the use of intense artillery shelling and aerial bombardment. As part of precautions to avoid civilian casualties the military had distributed leaflets requesting local population take shelter at places of worship. For their safety hundreds of civilians had taken refuge in the Roman Catholic church in Navaly.

== Incident ==
The Church of St. Peter and Paul in Navaly on the Jaffna Peninsula was bombed by a Sri Lankan military aircraft on the afternoon of 9 July 1995. Several hundred Tamil civilians were taking refuge at the church and surrounding environs at the time.

According to Daya Somasundaram, senior professor of psychiatry at University of Jaffna, the church was well away from the fighting. He termed this attack a war crime committed by the Sri Lankan Air Force.

== Initial reports ==
The news of the incident was first broken by the International Committee of the Red Cross, which at the time was the only aid agency working in the Tamil areas. The ICRC helped evacuate many of the wounded by ambulance to the Jaffna Teaching Hospital.

Immediate casualties were given as 65 killed and over 150 injured, including men, women and children. Eventually this figure rose to 147 killed, as many succumbed to their injuries, partly because the hospital was unable to cope with so many casualties at one time.

== Aftermath ==
The Sri Lankan government initially denied any knowledge of the bombing, and then claimed it could have been LTTE mortars that caused the damage. The Commander of the Sri Lankan Air Force stated they exploded LTTE ammunition trucks or underground ammunition storage and that the deaths of the civilians were caused by secondary explosions of underground LTTE ammunition dumps. However, in a later report, the ICRC head in Sri Lanka, Marco Altherr, said that it was indeed bombs that had fallen on the area; he further included eyewitness accounts from civilians in the area, including a priest from another church in the vicinity, that also supported this claim. Eventually the government agreed to investigate the incident.

The Red Cross protested in the aftermath of the attack. However, this protest was brought to a close after the members involved in the protest were summoned to the Foreign Office and asked to give it up. The Sri Lankan foreign minister Lakshman Kadirgamar denied that the armed forces committed the attack and rebuked the Red Cross for issuing a statement on the basis of "so-called eye witness accounts".

== Government investigation ==
On 11 July, Sri Lankan President Chandrika Kumaratunga released a statement that expressed "sorrow at the loss of lives" and ordered the investigation of the bombing. On 18 July 1995, the military confirmed that the church was badly damaged but said that they could not confirm the origin of the bombs that destroyed it. In 2020, Kumaratunga admitted that it was an Air Force bombing, albeit a mistake, and claimed that she had criticized the Air Force for it at the time.

== See also ==
- List of attacks on civilians attributed to Sri Lankan government forces
- 2017 al-Jinah airstrike – Airstrike by the United States Armed Forces
- Church of Saint Porphyrius airstrike – 2023 bombing of a church in Gaza City, Palestine
- Aerial bombardment and international law
