= Velgam Vehera =

Sri Lankan Buddhist temple

- වෙල්ගම් වෙහෙර
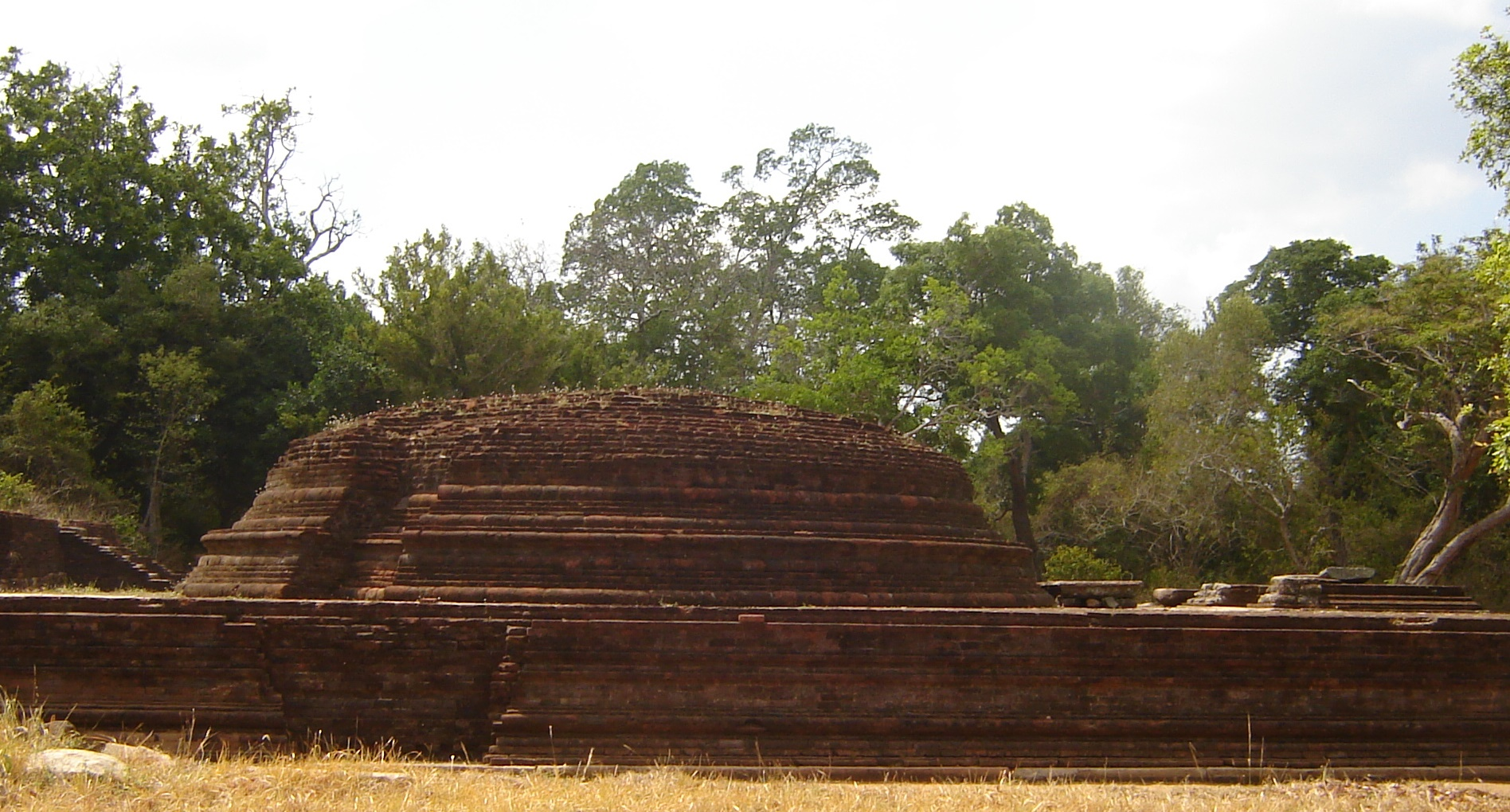
- Ancient Stupa in Velgam Vehera

Religion
- Affiliation: Buddhism
- District: Trincomalee
- Province: Eastern Province

Location
- Location: Trincomalee, Sri Lanka
- Interactive map of Velgam Vehera
- Coordinates: 08°38′44.4″N 81°10′16.4″E

Architecture
- Type: Buddhist Temple
- Founder: King Devanampiyathissa (307–267 BC)
- Archaeological Protected Monument of Sri Lanka
- Designated

Website
- https://www.welgamvehera.lk/

Velgam Vehera (also known as Vilgam Rajamaha Viharaya) (Sinhala: වෙල්ගම් වෙහෙර) is a historical Buddhist temple situated in Kanniya, Trincomalee District, Sri Lanka. It also known to Hindus as Natanar Kovil. Historically Velgam Vehera was one of important Buddhist temples in the country, worshiped by both Sinhala and Tamil Buddhists.

The temple has been declared as an archaeological protected site in Trincomalee District by Sri Lanka Archaeological Department.

== History ==
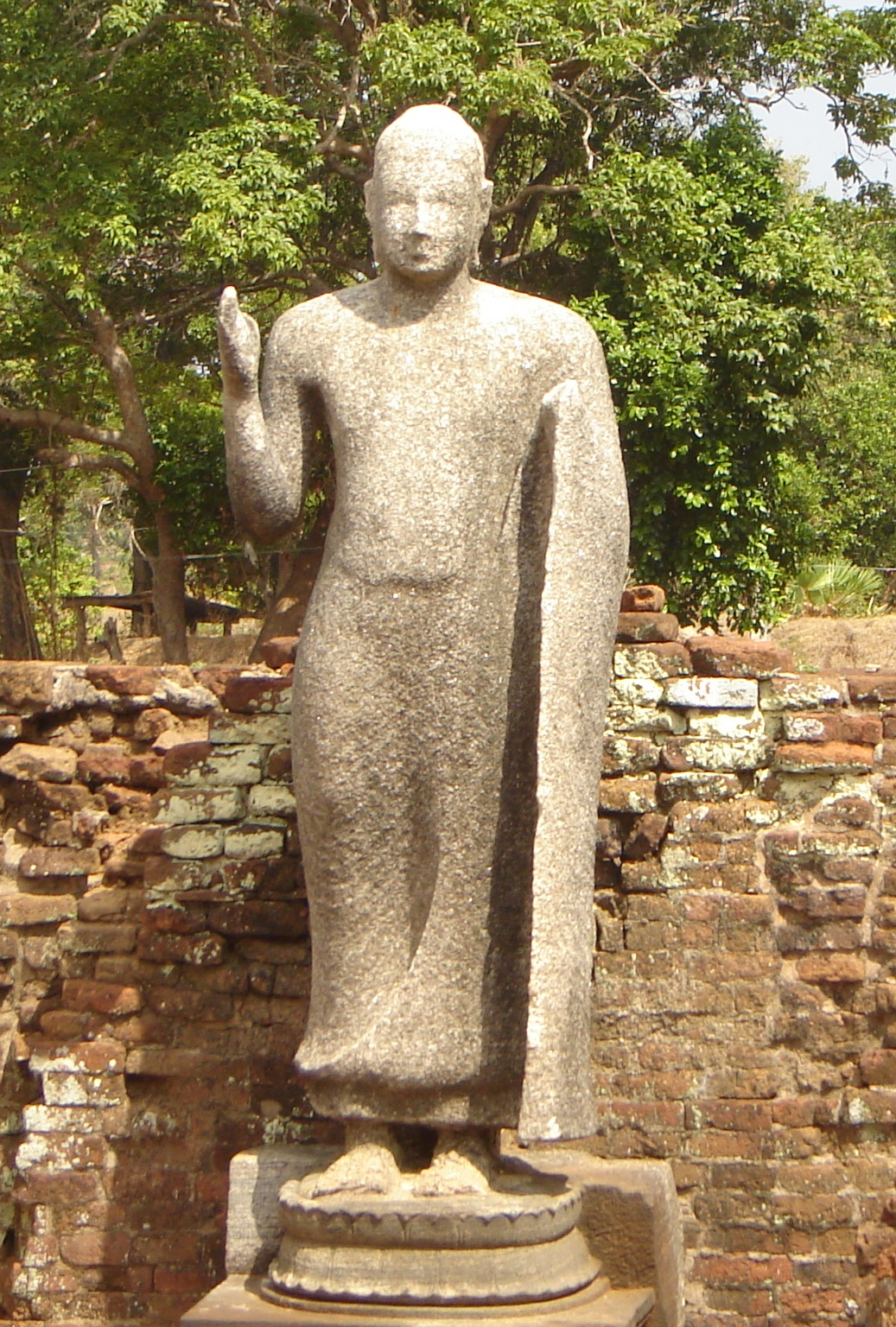
Standing Buddha statue in the vihara

This temple is believed to be built during the reign of King Devanampiyathissa (307–267 BC) with later renovations haven been undertaken by King Bathiya I, Agkbo II, Vijayabahu I and Parakramabahu I. An inscription found in the temple was written during the reign of King Bhatika Tissa (141-165 AD). The inscription mentions revenue from certain fields to the Abagara Vihara (Velgam Vihara) and Velgama by the king's commander, Abaya. Following the collapse of the Anuradhapura and Polonnaruwa Kingdoms the population migrated to the southern part of country, which resulted in the temple being abandoned and falling into ruin.

With the invasion of Cholas from India in 993 AD, many of Buddhist shines was destroyed in the country. Velgam Vihara however managed to survive unscathed. The Cholas instead renovated the temple, adding their own structures and renamed it Rajarajaperumpalli, after King Rajaraja I. Some of Tamil inscriptions found in the temple record donations to the temple made during the reigns of King Rajaraja and Rajendradeva.

In 1929 the ruins of Velgam Vehera were discovered by the Sri Lanka Archaeological Department and in 1934 the site was declared as an archaeological protected reserve.

== Ruins ==
Some of ruins have been scattered throughout the temple premises, these include stone inscriptions, brick dagobas, parts of the image houses, korawak gal (balustrades) and plain mura gal (guard stones) and Moon stones.

== See also ==
- List of Archaeological Protected Monuments in Sri Lanka
- Kanniya Hot water spring
