= Keerimalai =

Keerimalai கீரிமலை කීරිමලෛයි
- Town
- Location within Northern Province
- Coordinates: 9°49′0″N 80°0′0″E
- Country: Sri Lanka
- Province: Northern
- District: Jaffna
- DS Division: Valikamam North

Keerimalai (Tamil: கீரிமலை kīrimalai) is a town in Jaffna District, Sri Lanka. Naguleswaram temple is located in this suburb. The mineral water spring called Keerimalai Springs here is reputed for its curative properties. In Tamil, Keerimalai means "mongoose-hill"; see Naguleswaram temple. Keerimalai is situated 25 km north of Jaffna.

== Gallery ==
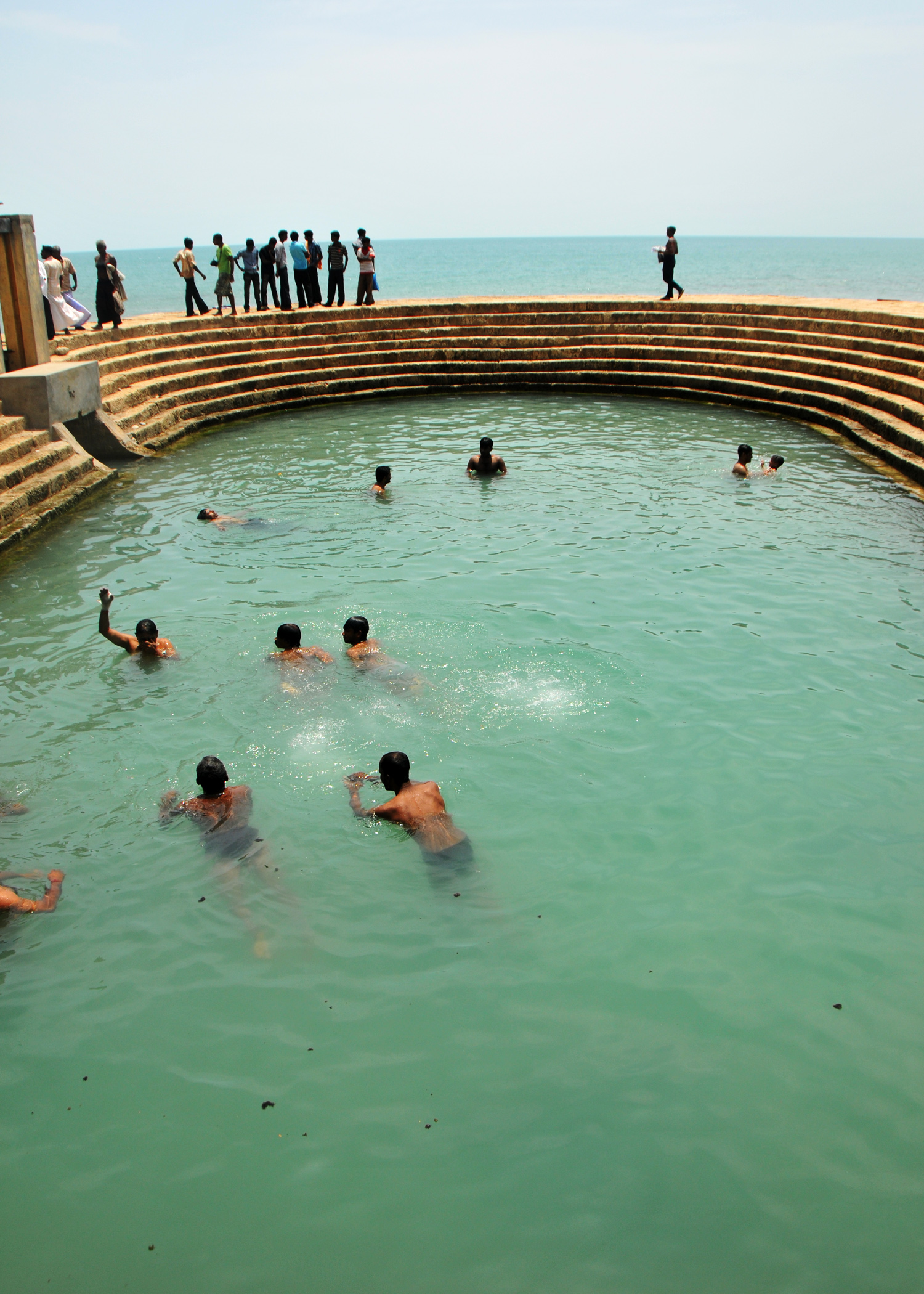
Keerimalai springs

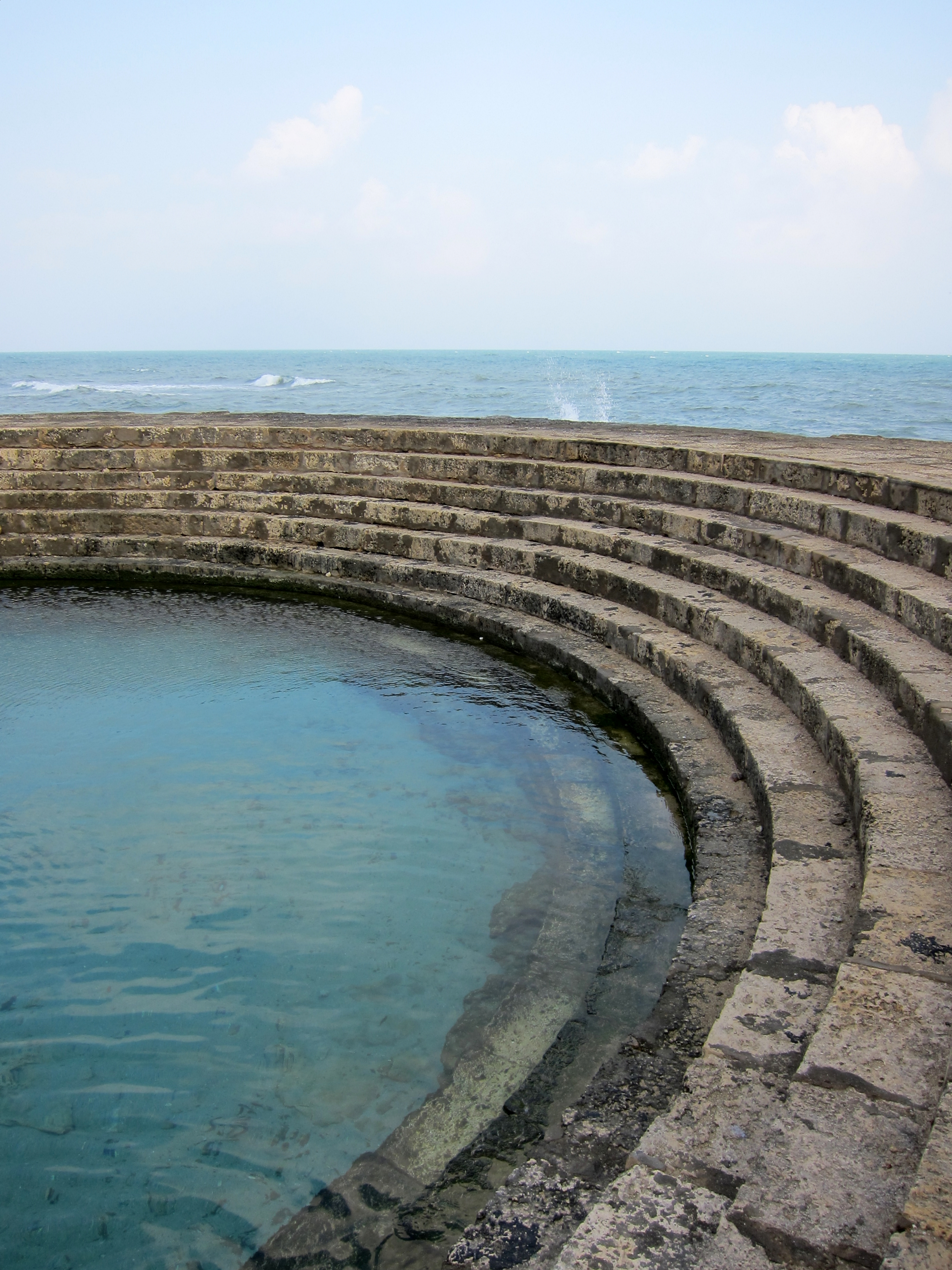
Keerimalai springs

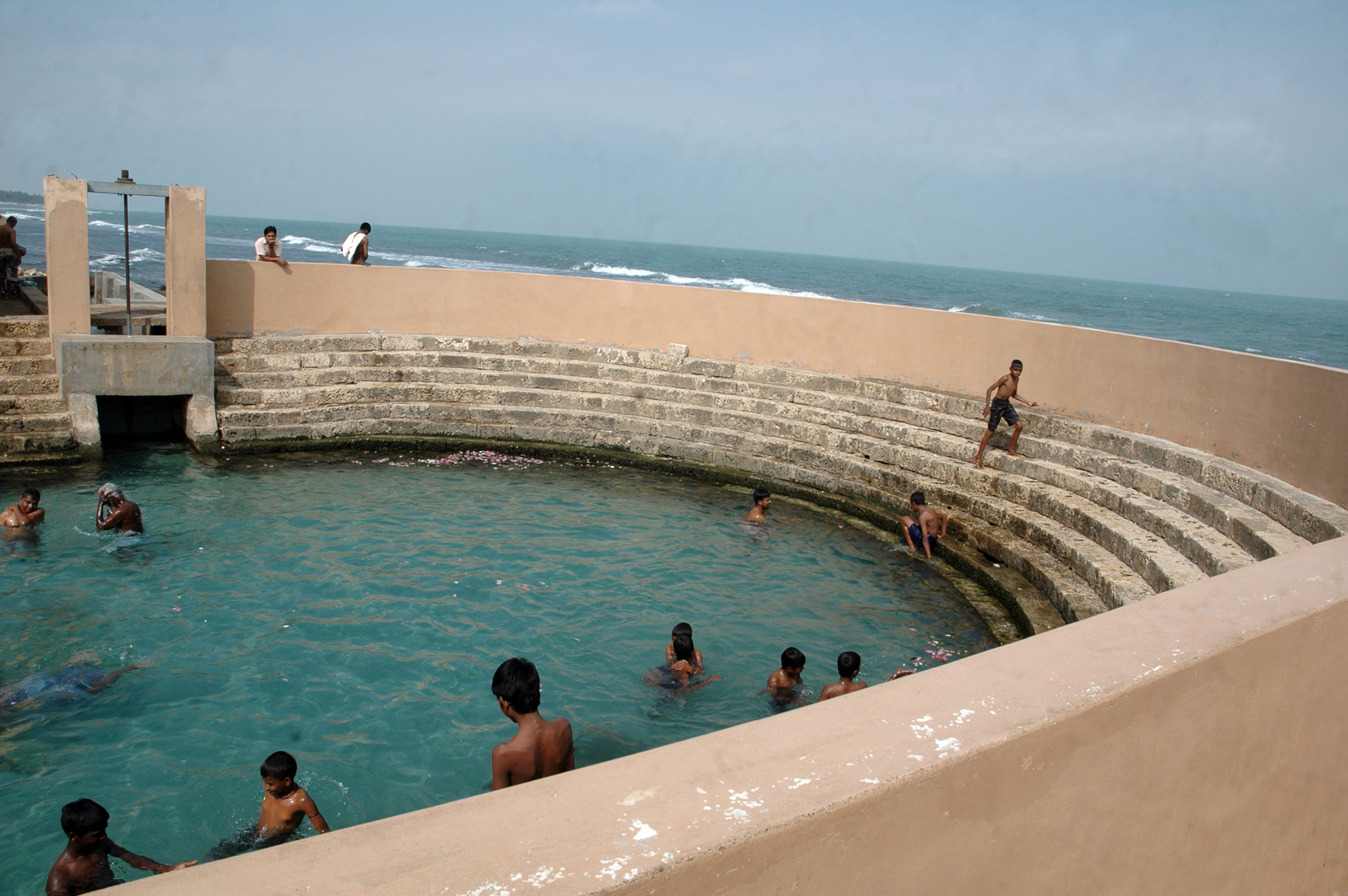
Keerimalai pond

== See also ==
- Casuarina Beach
- Kantharodai
- Nallur (Jaffna)
- Naguleswaram temple
- Nallur Kandaswamy Kovil
- Nainativu
- Neduntheevu
- Nilavarai
- Idikundu
- Hinduism in Sri Lanka
