= Karainagar =

Karainagar காரைநகர் කාරෛනගර්
- Town
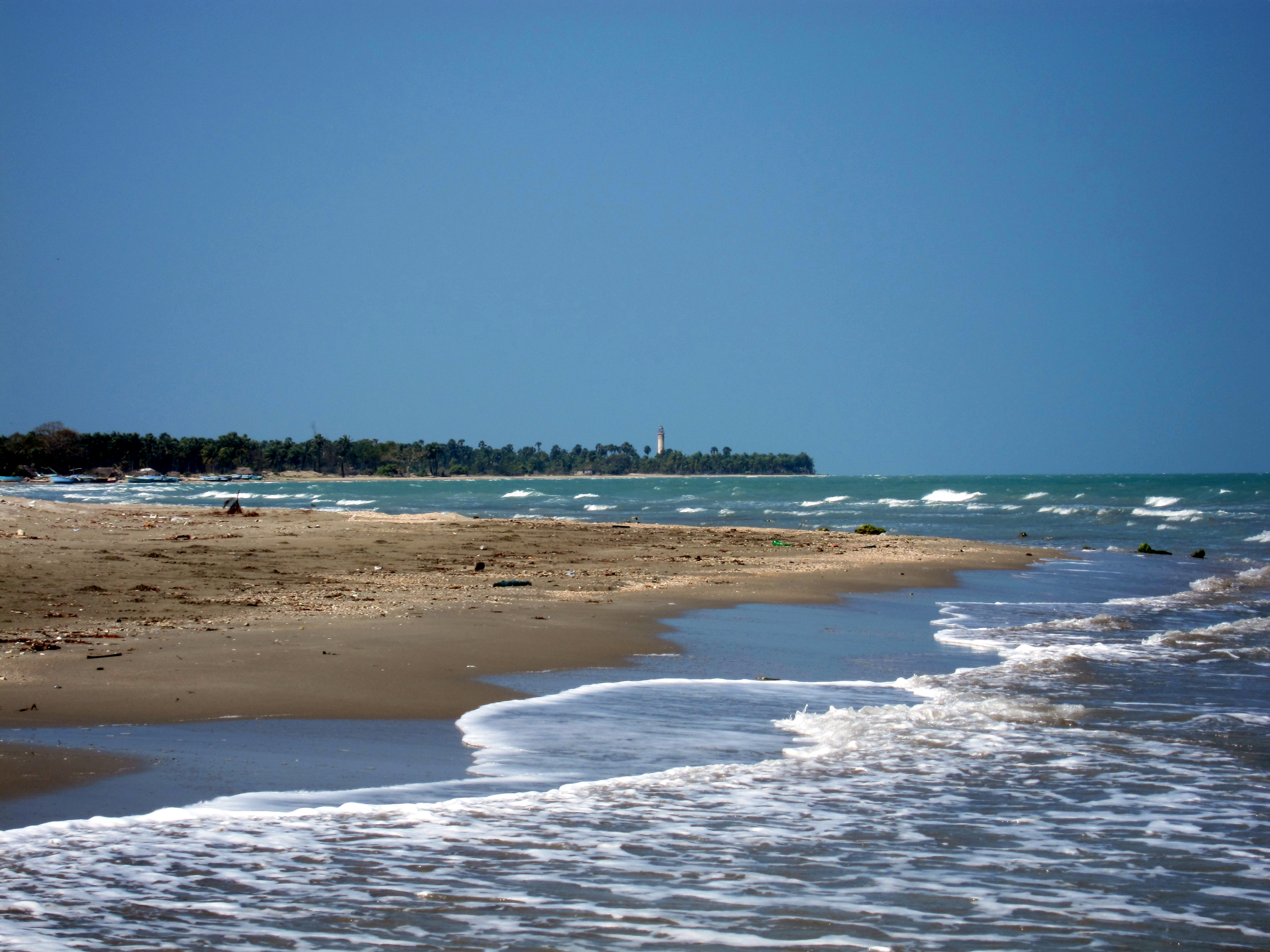
- Casuarina Beach

- Location within Northern Province
- Coordinates: 9°44′0″N 79°52′0″E
- Country: Sri Lanka
- Province: Northern
- District: Jaffna
- DS Division: Karainagar

Karainagar (Tamil: காரைநகர்) (pronounced Kaarai-Nagar) is located 20 km from Jaffna, Sri Lanka, on the island of Karaitivu. In Tamil, the name is derived from the Tamil word 'kadar-karai' meaning a settlement (or town) on the sea coast. Karainagar is the nearest town to Casuarina Beach.
