= Port of Jambukola =

Jambukolapattinam or Dambakola Patuna (Sinhala: දඹකොළ පටුන; Tamil: ஜம்புகோலப்பட்டினம் ) is an ancient port to the north of Jaffna, in the Northern Province of Sri Lanka. Jambukolapattinam was a prominent maritime hub during the early centuries of the Common Era and played a crucial role in the trade and cultural exchanges between India, Sri Lanka, and other Southeast Asian regions

== History ==
After Mahinda Thero brought Buddhism to Sri Lanka in 250BC, his sister, Theri Sanghamitta arrived in Sri Lanka with a Sacred Bo Sapling one year later to this port. The temple Samudda-panasala (Jambukola Viharaya) was built commemorating the arrival of the Bo sapling by King Devanampiya Tissa (250-210 BC). Later, the same king planted one of the first eight shoots of the Sri Maha Bodhi, on the same place where he kept the original tree before bringing it to Anuradhapura. King Vijayabahu I (1070–1110) has restored this site. The remains of the vihara, such as the Buddha footprint stone and vatadage seen up to recent times no longer exist there.

This port gradually faded in importance while the port of Manthai located at the mouth of Malvathu Oya developed as a key intersection of sea-routes and the Dambakola Patuna Viharaya was lost in time. The Great Chronicle of Sri Lanka, the Mahavamsa and Samantapasadika mention pilgrims coming from "Yonaka" country to Jambukola to worship the Jambukola Viharaya in the ancient times.

== See also ==
- Port of Mahatittha
- Port of Mathoddam
- Port of Urkavalthurai
