= Gandhavaṃsa =

The Gandhavamsa (lit. History of Literature; also Cullagandhavamsa and Cūḷaganthavaṃsa) is a volume of 17th century Pali literature by Nandapañña that describes the post-canonical Pali literature of Burma and Ceylon.
