= Naguleswaram temple =

Hindu temple in Northern Sri Lanka

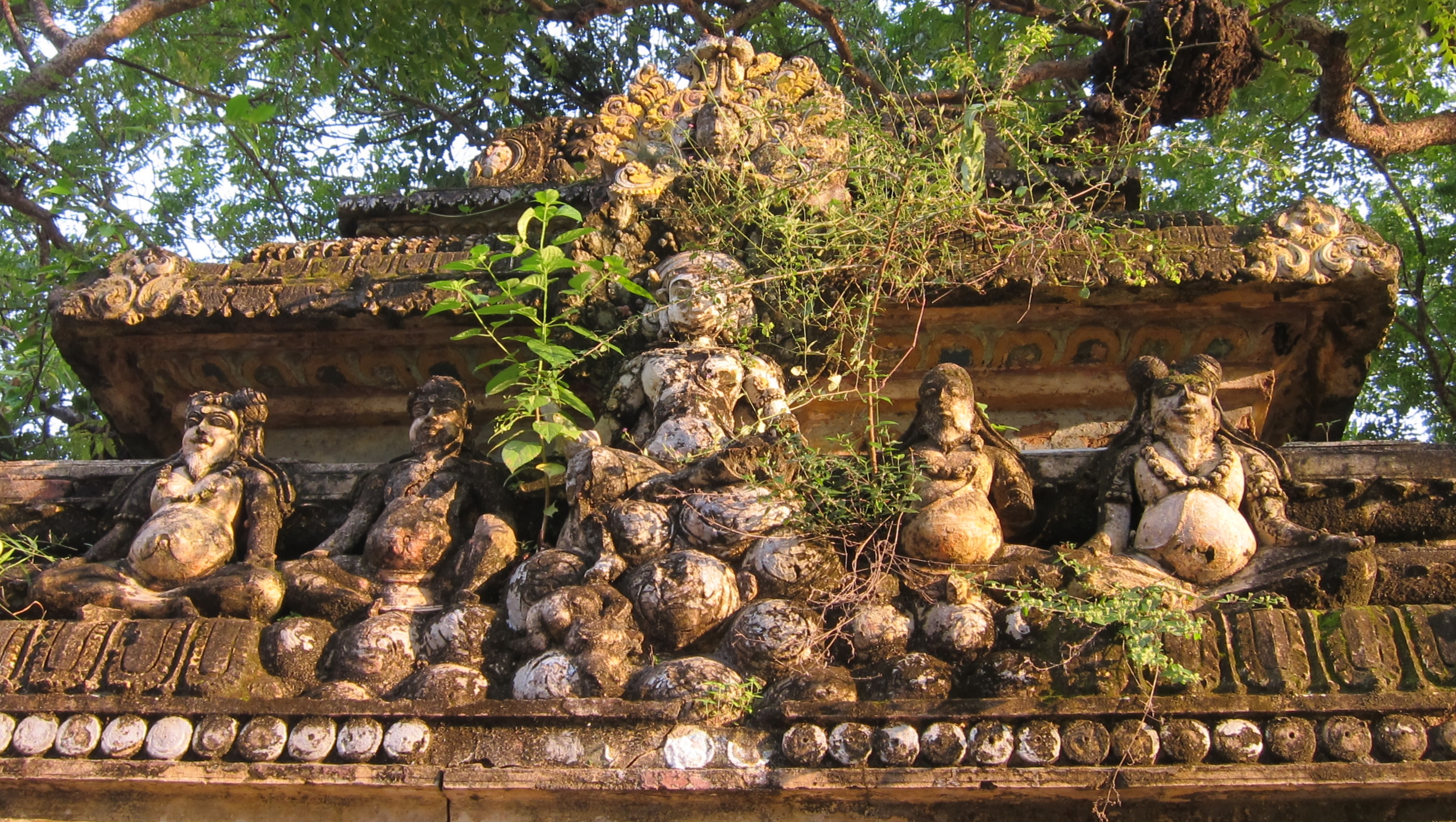
- The ancient Amablama of the Keerimalai Naguleswaram Kovil

- Location in Sri Lanka

Religion
- Affiliation: Hinduism
- District: Jaffna District
- Province: Northern
- Deity: Shiva

Location
- Location: Keerimalai, Kankesanturai
- Country: Sri Lanka
- Interactive map of Naguleswaram temple
- Coordinates: 9°49′0″N 80°0′0″E

Architecture
- Type: Dravidian architecture
- Completed: 6th century BCE
- Archaeological Protected Monument of Sri Lanka
- Official name: Old Ambalama of Keerimalai Temple
- Designated: 30.12.2011

Keerimalai Naguleswaram temple (Tamil: கீரிமலை நகுலேஸ்வரம் கோயில்), historically known also as the Thirutambaleswaram Kovil of Keerimalai, is a famous Hindu temple in Keerimalai, located north of Jaffna, Northern Province, Sri Lanka in the suburb of Kankesanthurai. One of the oldest shrines of the region, it is the northernmost of the island's Pancha Ishwarams of Siva, venerated by Sri Lankan Tamil Hindus around the world from classical antiquity. Hindus believe its adjacent water tank, the Keerimalai Springs, to have curative properties, which irrigation studies attribute to high mineral content sourced from underground.

Keerimalai is 50 feet above sea level, and situated west of Palaly. Hindus flock in large numbers on Aadi Amaavaasai day which falls during the Tamil month of Aadi, to carry out rituals for their forefathers and bathe in the natural springs. Carried out largely by men, “Keerimalai” is particularly famous for this festival.

The temple was largely destroyed by Jesuit missionaries following the Portuguese conquest of the Jaffna kingdom, restored by Arumuka Navalar in 1894, was occupied by the Sri Lankan Army in 1983 and bombed by the Sri Lankan Air Force in 1993. After nearly twenty years, a major expansion and reopening of the temple occurred in 2012.

== History ==
=== Etymology ===
Keeri in Tamil and nagula in Sanskrit mean "mongoose". Keeri-malai in Tamil means "Mongoose-Hill". The temple is situated adjacent to the mineral water springs. The legendary sage Nagula Muni, shrunk by age and austerity while meditating at a cave in Keerimalai was likened to mongooses that frequented the area. The sage bathed in the springs and was cured of his mongoose face. In gratitude, Nagula Muni constructed a small shrine and worshipped the Lingam enshrined there. This became known as the Thirutambaleswaram Kovil of Keerimalai and also the Naguleswaram Kovil of Keerimalai alluding to the sage.

=== Development ===
Naguleswaram temple of Kankesanthurai was restored during the reign of Prince Vijaya of Vanga (543-505 BCE). One of the oldest shrines of the region, it is the northernmost shrine on the island of the Pancha Ishwarams of Lord Siva, venerated by Sri Lankan Tamil Hindus around the world from classical antiquity. Its adjacent water tank, the Keerimalai Springs attribution to curative properties has been related in irrigation scientific studies to its high mineral content, sourced from underground.

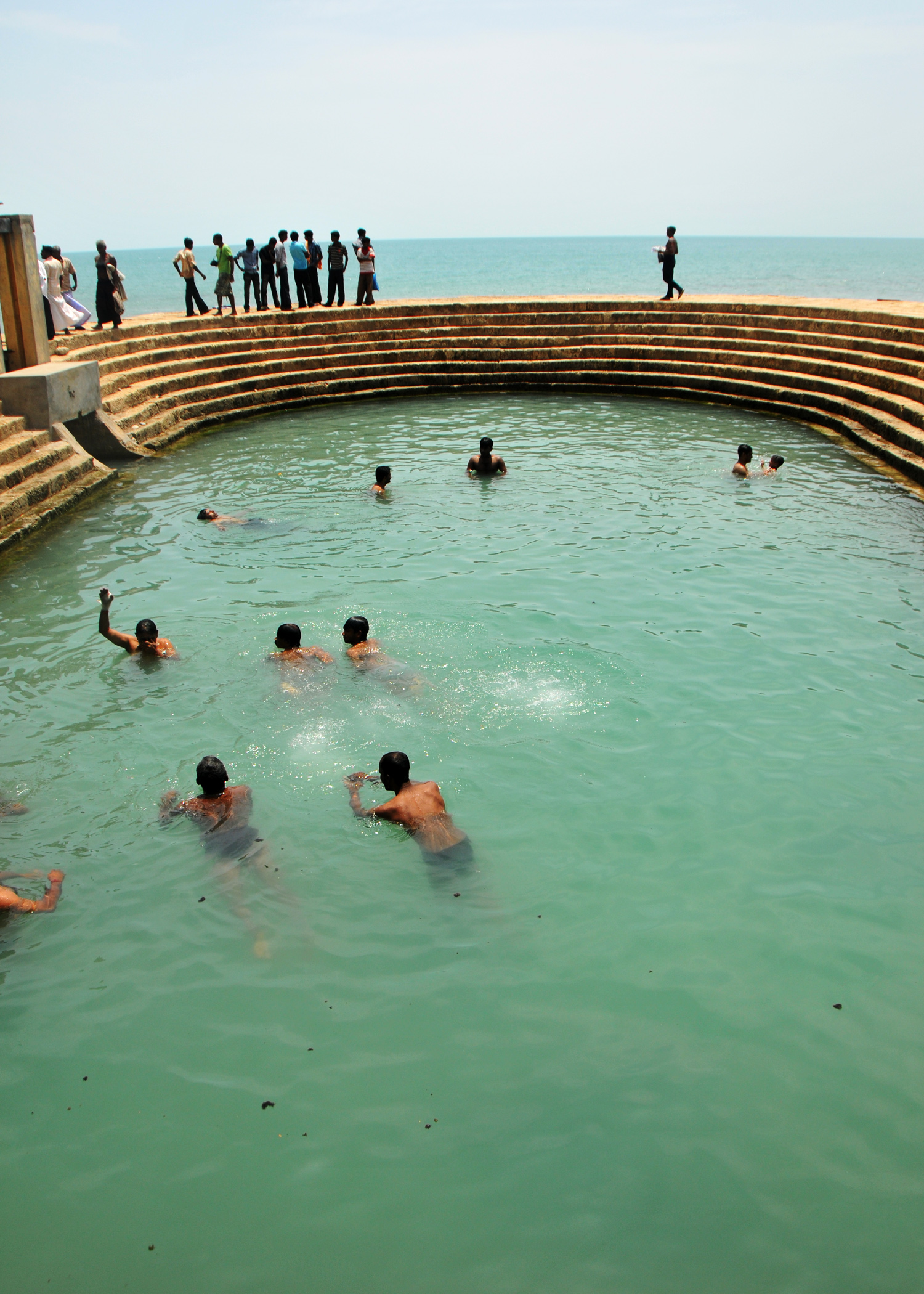
Keerimalai springs, Kankesanthurai

The Pandyan-Cholan princess Maruthapura Veeravalli built the Maviddapuram Kandaswamy Temple two miles from Naguleswaram in 785 CE after she was cured of her facial disfigurement at the Keerimalai springs, and later married the King Ukkira Singhan a scion of Vijaya's dynasty, at the temple's springs. Eliandurvan, one of the four brothers of the Mukkuvar king Vedi Arasan ruled at Keerimalai.

=== Festivals ===
"Maasi Magam" and "Aadi Amaavaasai" festival days, the latter falling during the Tamil month of "Aadi" (mid July-mid August) brings Hindu pilgrims to the town to carry out rituals for their forefathers and take a divine dip in the natural springs. These rituals are usually carried out by men. Keerimalai is particularly famous for this festival. The new moon or Amaavasai is a significant day, and according to Tamil astrologers, in the month of Aadi, the moon is in the ascendant in Kataka rasi, which is occupied by the Sun; this concurrence is reminiscent of Siva and Sakthi in Hinduism. Hence, there is special significance of Aadi Amavaasai as a day when children remember their departed parents, notably their late fathers. It is customary for them to perform ablutions, offer prayers to the departed souls with the help of a priest (Dharpanam) and attend a temple of Siva. In Sri Lanka, Keerimalai Naguleswaram temple continues as the foremost shrine for Aadi amavaasai.

=== Literature ===
Dakshina Kailasa Puranam, a Sanskrit treatise on another Pancha Ishwaram, Koneswaram of Trincomalee, recalls events in the Naguleswaram shrine. On Saivism in the 6th century, the Suta Samhita of the Skanda Puranam mentions Naguleswaram as among ancient sites of pilgrimage. Arab navigators spread the wonders of the temple's springs to the West, and James Emerson Tennent, citing Lane's Arabian Nights elaborates on Keerimalai as the site of the shipwreck of Sinbad the Sailor during his sixth voyage, where he collected pearls, hyacinth and ambergris. Arjuna of the Mahabharata fell in love with the Nagakanya (daughter of the Naga king) Ulupi, who bore them a son, Iravan.

=== Destruction by the Portuguese ===
Following destruction by the Portuguese in 1621, Naguleswaram's Brahmin priests hid the main icons in a well before fleeing, which were since recovered.

=== Reconstruction ===
After a gap of almost 400 years in 1894 ACE, local Sri Lankan Tamil Hindu people of under the urging of Hindu reformer Arumuka Navalar came together and built the present temple. However the temple was destroyed by fire in 1918 and had to be rebuilt.

=== Occupation and bombing by Sri Lankan Army ===
In 1983, the temple was occupied by the Sri Lankan army and devotees and priests were unable to visit the premises without special permits. At 16:00 on 16 October 1990, the Sri Lankan Air Force dropped three bombs at Naguleswaram. The first fell on the front of the temple destroying two temple chariots and other buildings, the second bomb fell on the southern courtyard of the temple destroying the premises of the priest. Two days later, on 18 October at 14:30, the Sri Lankan Air Force returned and bombed the temple during the Kedara Gowri fast when thousands of devotees were present, killing 180 Tamil civilians, including 5 infants. Temple buildings, its ancient gopuram, the library housing palm leaf manuscripts and statues incurred substantial damage. The bombing was carried out despite the presence of temple identification flags at four corners of the temple, as instructed by the International Committee of the Red Cross. No access to the area was granted to devotees until 1997, when the Chief Priest was allowed to visit with an Additional GA of the Sri Lankan government. The temple was found to be ruins with the sacred icons vandalized or missing. The temple was not restored.

=== Mahakumbhabhishekam in 2012 ===
On Monday 6 February 2012, a major reconstruction of the temple was completed under the authority of the chief priest, Sivasri Naguleswara Kurukkal, and Naguleswaram's Mahakumbhabhishekam took place. It was a monumental event with thousands of devotees who came to pray and receive blessings.

== Gallery ==
Naguleswaram Temple Gallery
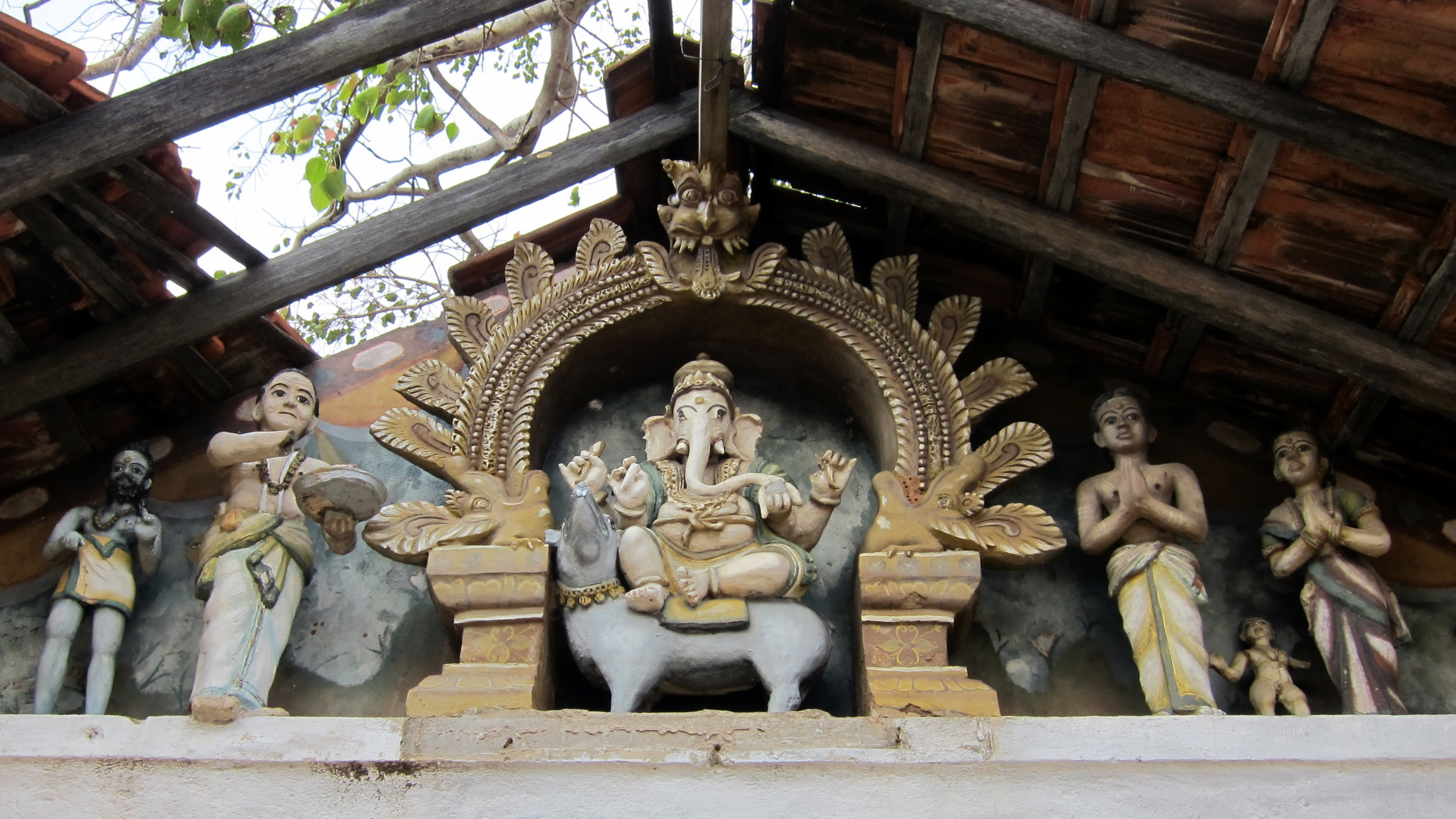

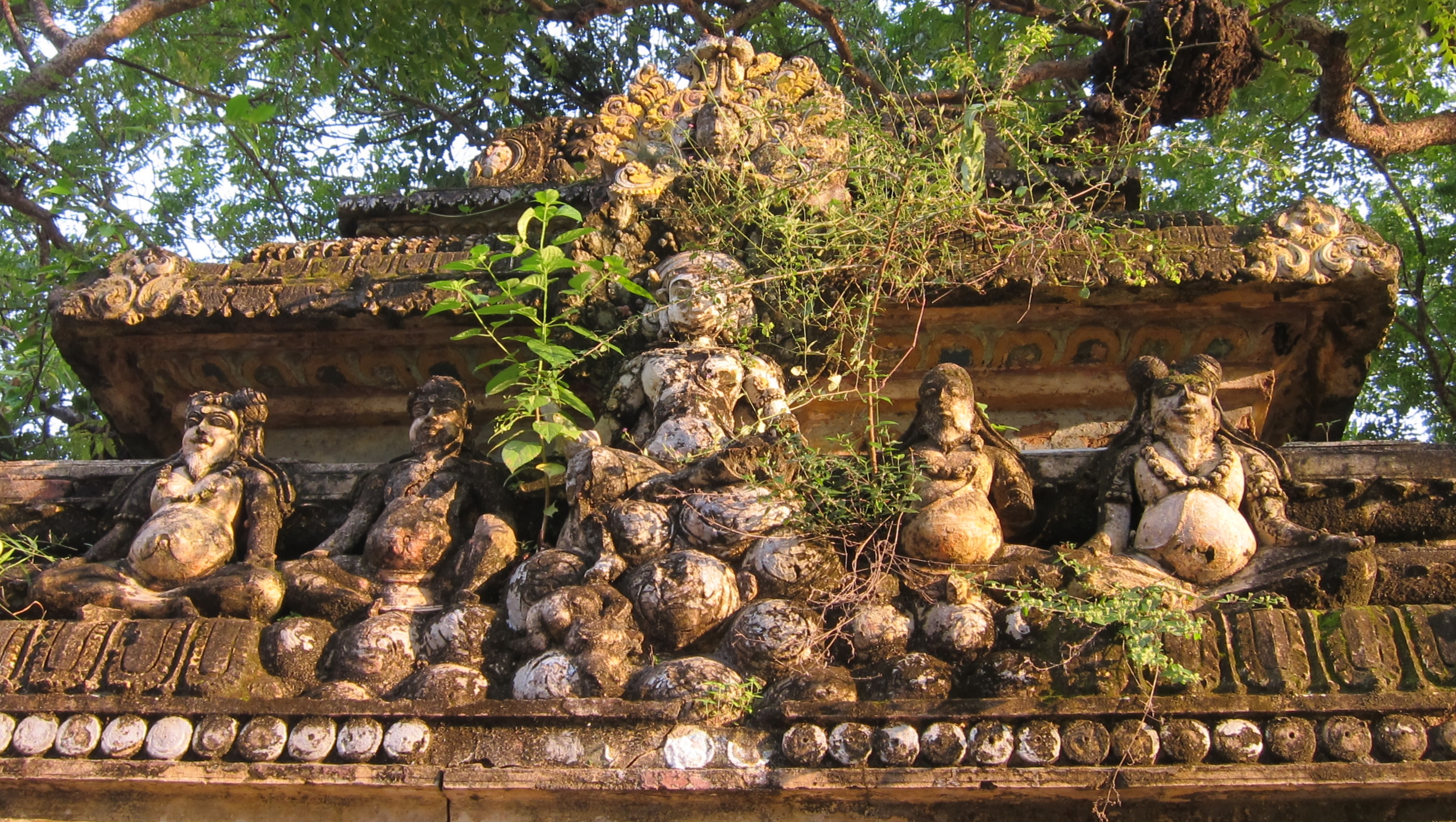

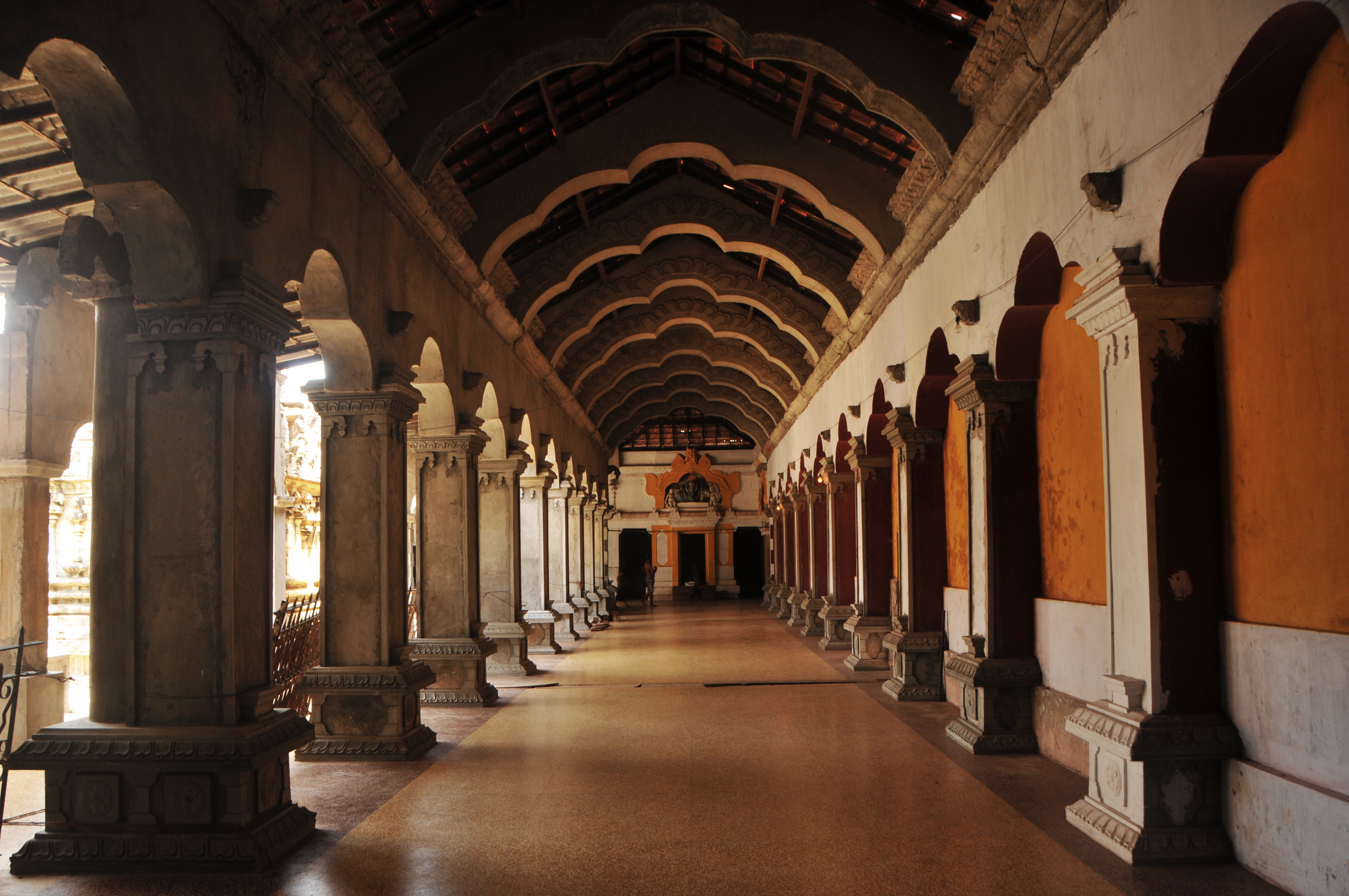

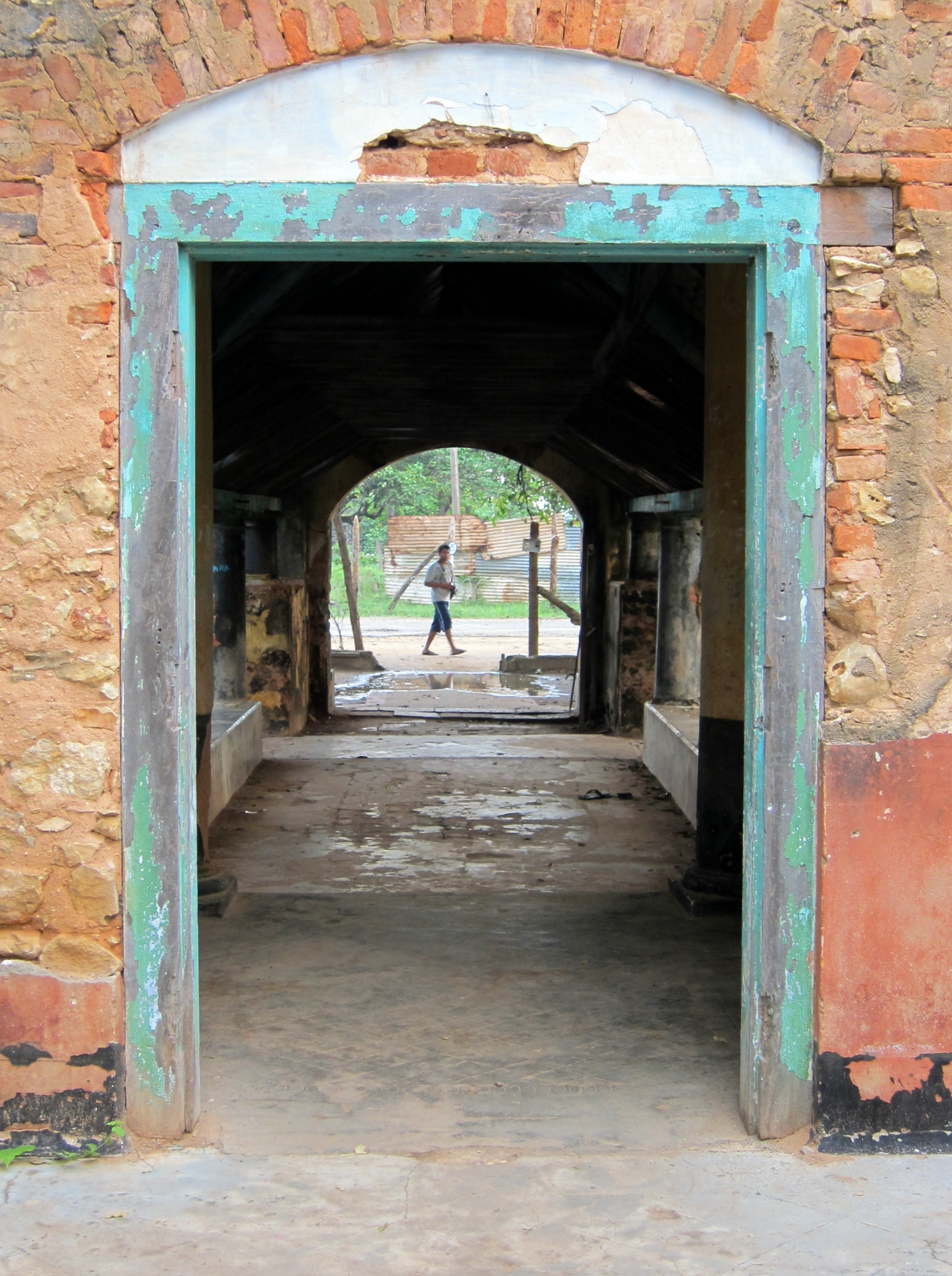

== See also ==
- Hinduism in Sri Lanka
- Nallur Kandaswamy Kovil
- Vallipuram
- Keerimalai
- Kantharodai
