= Kandarodai =

Hamlet and archaeological site in Chunnakam, Sri Lanka

Kandarodai (Tamil: கந்தரோடை, romanized: Kantarōṭai, Sinhala: කදුරුගොඩ, romanized: Kadurugoḍa, also known as Tamil: கதிரமலை, romanized: Katiramalai) is a small hamlet and archaeological site of Chunnakam town, a suburb in Jaffna District, Sri Lanka. The notable ancient Buddhist monastery referred to as Kadurugoda Vihara is situated in Kandarodai.

== Etymology ==
According to C. Rasanayagam this place was initially known as Kadiramalai which is attested in the Kailayamalai chronicle. He derives the Sinhalese name Kadurugoḍa from Kadiragoda, which according to him is derived from Kadiramalai, substituting the Tamil suffix malai (meaning "mountain") with the Sinhalese suffix goḍa. The prefix Kadira is the Tamil name for the Acacia chundra tree. The modern Tamil name Kantarōṭai is believed to be re-derived from the Kadiragoda term.

Few scholars holds that Kadurugoda is derived from the Sinhalese name Kandavurugoda (a site of a military encampment). The Portuguese archives refer to this place as Kandarcudde. The name Kadurogoda viharaya is mentioned in the 15th century Sinhalese text Nampota.

== History ==
In 1970, the University of Pennsylvania museum team excavated a ceramic sequence remarkably similar to that of Arikamedu in Tamil Nadu, with a Pre-rouletted ware period, subdivided into an earlier "Megalithic", a later "Pre-rouletted ware phase," followed by a "Rouletted ware period". Tentatively assigned to the fourth century BCE, radio carbon dating later confirmed an outer date of the ceramics and Megalithic cultural commencement in Kandarodai to 1300 BCE. During this excavation, the university team discovered a potsherd carrying a Sinhalese Prakrit inscription written in Brahmi scripts. (Note: In an excavation of Kandarodai by a team of archaeologists from the Pennsylvania University in the USA in 1970 a potsherd having lithic inscription of a few letters in Brahmi script was discovered and tagged as KTD14.....The potsherd being the only oldest inscribed artifact discovered in the Jaffna is of utmost importance. It is also the only artifact with genuine Brahmi scripting and symbols discovered in the Jaffna District....In 1973 Prof Indrapala leaves the following observations...."Its language bears the same language used in the pre-Christian cave inscriptions. It is in Sinhala Prakrit. Datahapata means Dattaha's begging bowl....")

Black and red ware Kanterodai potsherd with Tamil Brahmi scripts from 300 BCE excavated with Roman coins, early Pandyan coins, early Chera Dynasty coins from the emporium Karur punch-marked with images of the Hindu Goddess Lakshmi from 500 BCE, punch-marked coins called Puranas from 6th-5th century BCE India, and copper kohl sticks similar to those used by the Egyptians found in Uchhapannai, Kandarodai indicate active transoceanic maritime trade between ancient Jaffna Tamils and other continental kingdoms in the prehistoric period.

The parallel third century BCE discoveries of Manthai, Anaikoddai and Vallipuram detail the arrival of a megalithic culture in Jaffna long before the Buddhist-Christian era and the emergence of rudimentary settlements that continued into early historic times marked by urbanization. Some scholars have identified Kourola mentioned by 2nd century AD Greek geographer Ptolemy and Kamara mentioned by the 1st century AD Periplus of the Erythraean Sea as being Kadiramalai.

The earliest people of Jaffna were belonging to a megalithic culture akin to the South Indian megalithic culture. The period of Buddhism in the Jaffna Peninsula differ from the rest of the island, which is seen as an overlapping of the megalithic beliefs with Buddhism. According to scholars was Kantarodai, known in Tamil literature as Kadiramalai, the capital of the ancient Tamil Kingdom ruled by Tamil speaking Naga kings from 7th century AD to 10th century AD. The Yalpana Vaipava Malai also describes Kadiramalai as the seat of Ukkirasinghan who fell in love with a Chola princess in the ancient period. The ancient Kadurugoda Vihara Buddhist monastery is situated at this site where a 10th-century pillar inscription of Sinhalese language recording a regal proclamation of the bequest of gifts and benefits to a Buddhist place of worship was found. Kandarodai was a Buddhist mercantile centre among Tamils.

== Education ==
Kandarodai has a number of education institutions notably Kantharodai Tamil Kandaiya Vidyasalai and Skandavarodaya College.

== Gallery ==
Kandarodai Gallery
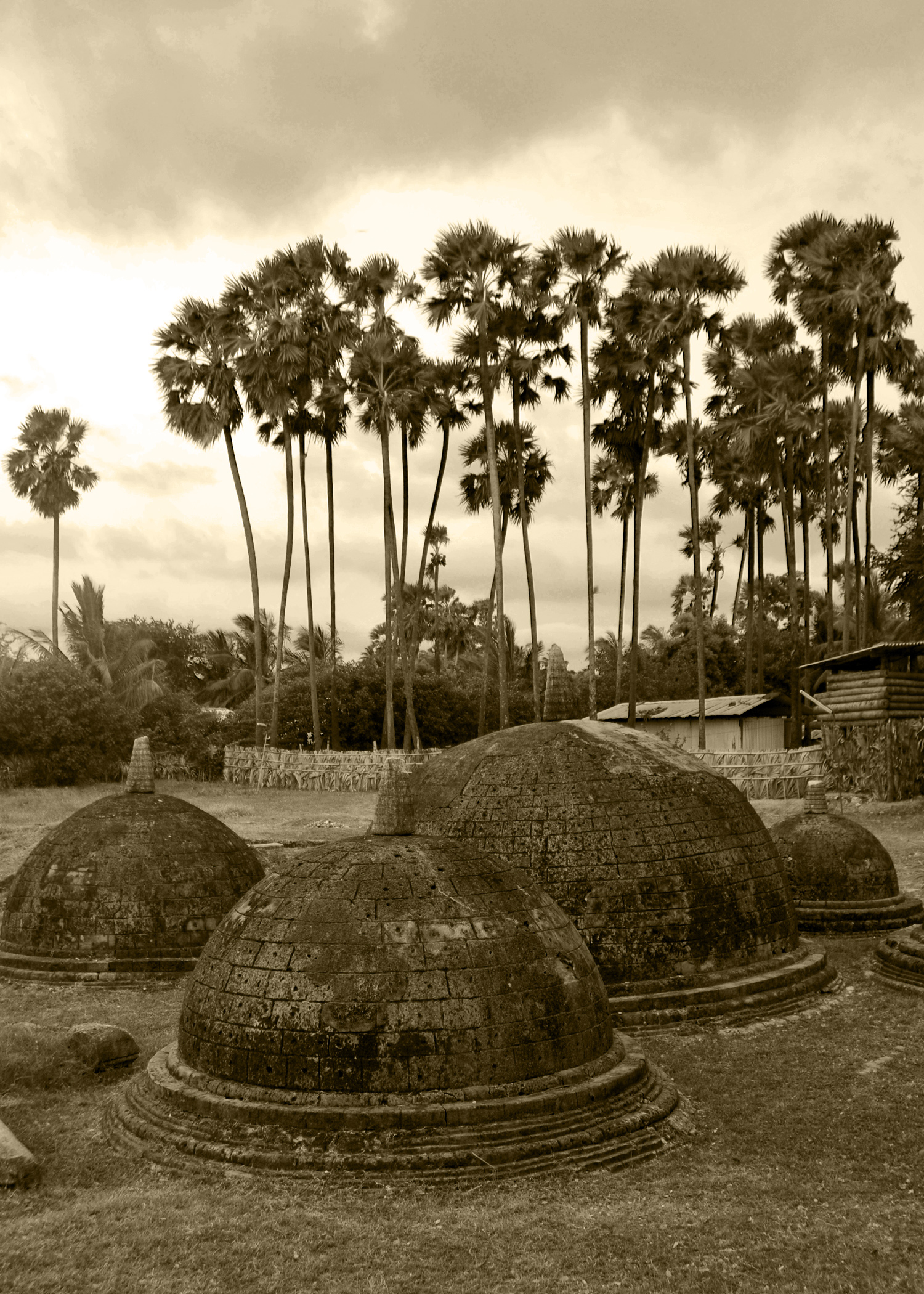
Buddhist Archeological excavations at Kandarodai in Jaffna, ruins dated to the 9th century AD.

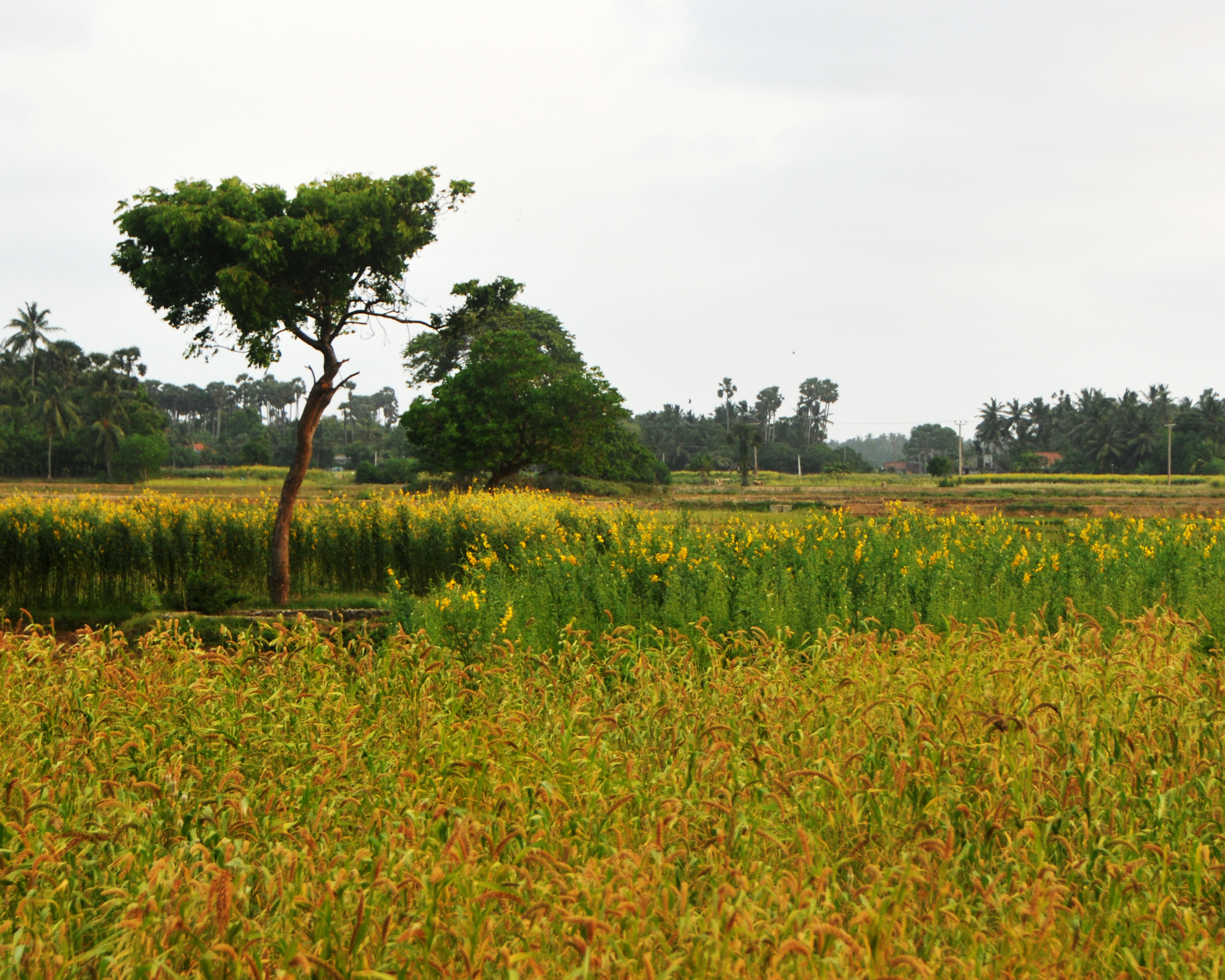
Part of farm land near Kandarodai in Jaffna peninsula.

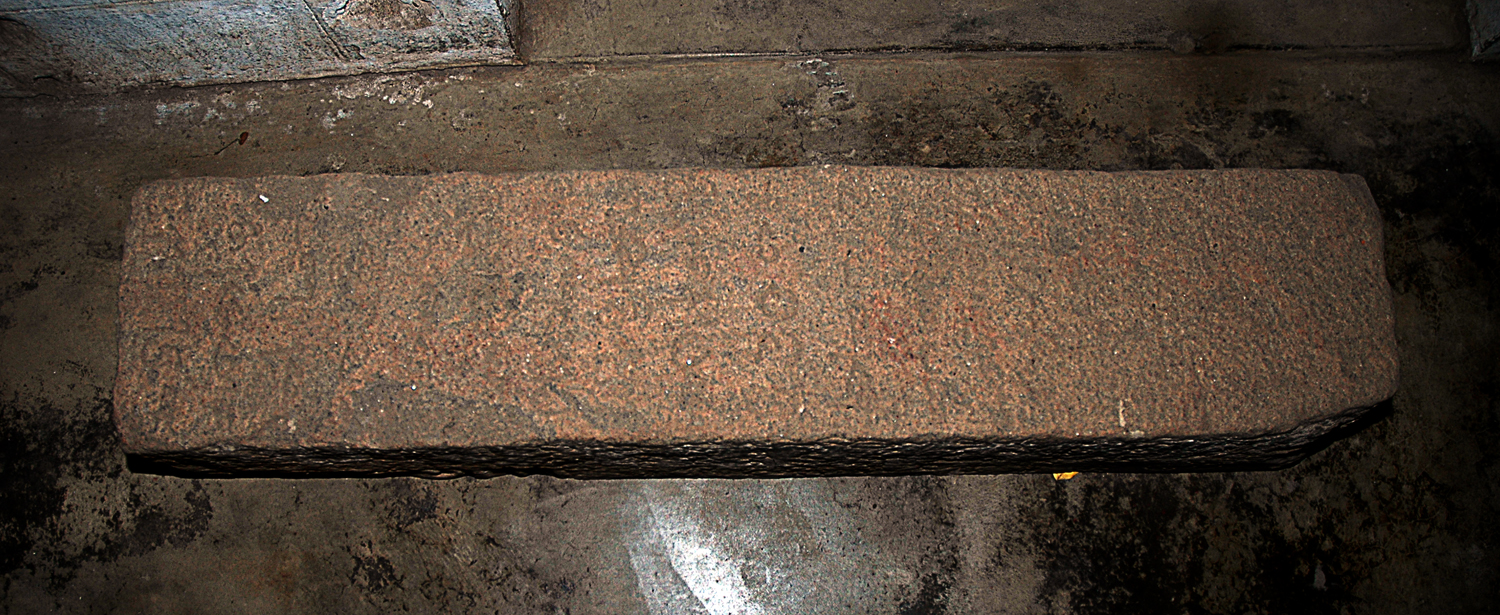
One of the Tamil plaque.

== See also ==
- Nallur (Jaffna)
- Vallipuram
- Naguleswaram temple
- Nainativu
- Kudiramalai
