= Hinduism in Sri Lanka =

Sri Lankan Hindus
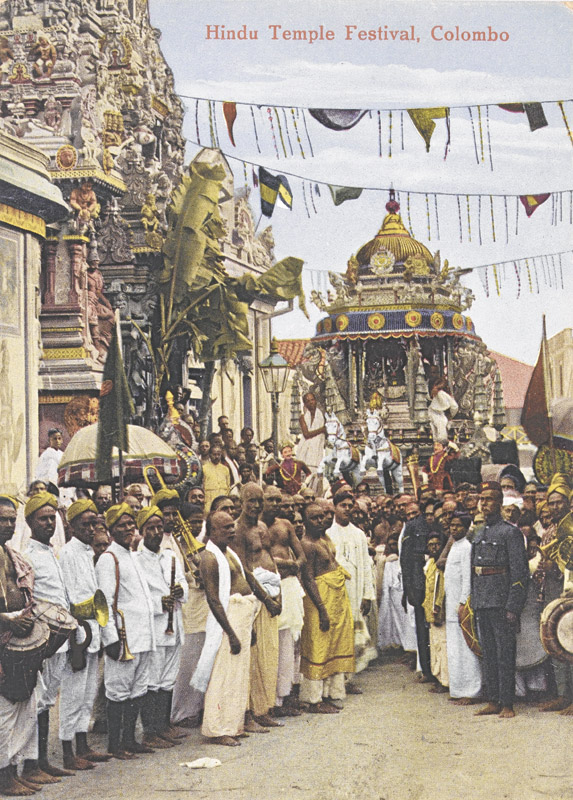
- Hindu temple festival in Colombo in 1900s.

Total population
- 2,744,507 (2024); 12.6% of its total population

Religions
- Hinduism; Shaivism (majority); Vaishnavism and Shaktism (minority)

Scriptures
- Ramayana and Vedas

Languages
- Old Tamil and Sanskrit (sacred); Tamil (majority) and Sinhala (minority)

Hinduism is one of Sri Lanka's oldest religions. As of 2024, Hindus made up 12.6% of the Sri Lankan population. They are predominantly Tamils, belonging the Sri Lankan Tamil and Indian Tamil community.

According to the 1915 census, Hindus made up about 25% of the Sri Lankan population (including Indian indentured labourers brought by the British). Hinduism predominates in the Northern and Eastern Provinces (where Tamils remain the largest demographic), the central regions and Colombo, the capital. According to the 2024 census, there are 2,734,839 Hindus in Sri Lanka (12.6% of the country's population). During the Sri Lankan Civil War, many Tamils emigrated; Hindu temples, built by the Sri Lankan Tamil diaspora, maintain their religion, tradition, and culture.

Most Sri Lankan Hindus follow the Shaiva Siddhanta school of Shaivism, and some follow Shaktism. Sri Lanka is home to the five abodes of Shiva: Pancha Ishwarams, holy places believed to have been built by king Ravana. Murugan is one of the country's most popular Hindu deities, venerated by Hindu Tamils. The Buddhist Sinhalese and aboriginal Veddas venerate the local rendition of the deity, Katharagama deviyo. According to a 2023 Pew Survey, Majority (84%) of the Sri Lankan Buddhist said they pray and offer their respects to Ganesh. Similarly Majority (71%) of the Sri Lankan Hindus reported the same for Buddha. Majority of the Buddhists (81%) said they are willing to have a Hindu neighbour, as did the majority of Hindus (85%) regarding Buddhist neighbours.

Yogaswami of Jaffna is a significant Hindu religious figure in modern Sri Lankan history. A 20th-century mystic, he was the satguru and counselling sage of the country's Tamil Hindu population. The Ramakrishna Mission is active in the Ampara and Batticaloa districts, and the Shaiva Siddhanta school is prevalent in the north. Yogaswami was the 161st head of the Nandinatha Sampradaya, and was succeeded by Sivaya Subramuniyaswami.

== Legendary origins ==
The first major Hindu reference to Sri Lanka is found in the epic Ramayana. Lanka, now identified with Sri Lanka, was ruled by the yaksha king Kubera. The throne of Lanka was usurped by Kubera's half-brother Ravana, the epic's chief antagonist, who was killed by Rama, the seventh avatar of Vishnu. Ravana’s brother Vibhishana was crowned as the new king by Rama before his return to Ayodhya. The Ramayana also mentions Rama's Bridge, between India and Sri Lanka, which was built with rocks by Rama with the aid of Hanuman, Nala, Nila, and other vanaras. Many believers see the chain of sandbar, connecting Sri Lanka to India in satellite images, as remnants of the bridge. Archaeological evidence supports the worship of Shiva in parts of Sri Lanka since prehistoric times, before the arrival of the legendary Prince Vijaya. Ravana is stated to have been a devotee of Shiva.

== Historic roots ==
The Nagas are claimed to have practised an early form of Hinduism, worshipping Shiva and serpents. This animistic Shaivism is also common in Tamil Nadu and other parts of India. The Nagas who inhabited the Jaffna Peninsula were probably the ancestors of Sri Lankan Tamils. There are also strong claims that they spoke Tamil as their native language but only small proof is found. The 5 ancient Shiva temples of Sri Lanka are also said to have been built by the Nagas before 6th century BCE. The Nainativu Nagapooshani Amman Temple in Nainativu is believed to be one of the Shakta pithas.

Buddhism was introduced by Mahinda, the eldest son of Ashoka, during the reign of Devanampiya Tissa of Anuradhapura. His father Mutasiva and brother Mahasiva had names associated with Shiva suggesting prior Hindu beliefs. This is supported by the common occurrence of the personal name Shiva in the earliest Prakrit inscriptions. The Sinhalese embraced Buddhism, and the Tamils remained Hindus. Activity from across the Palk Strait in Tamil Nadu set the stage for Hinduism's survival in Sri Lanka. Shaivism (worship of Shiva) was dominant among the Tamils, and most of Sri Lanka's Hindu temple architecture and philosophy of Sri Lanka drew from that tradition. Sambandar noted a number of Sri Lankan Hindu temples in his works.

== Culture ==
=== Rituals ===
In common with South India, local rituals include Kavadi Attam and firewalking. These rituals have also influenced the Sinhalese on southern cost of the island; For an Instance, the inhabitants of Tangalle, Kudawella and the surrounding area perform Kavadi.

=== Religious teachers ===
Religious teachers include Kaddai Swami, his shishya Chellappaswami, and Chellappaswami's shishya Yogaswami.

=== Temples ===
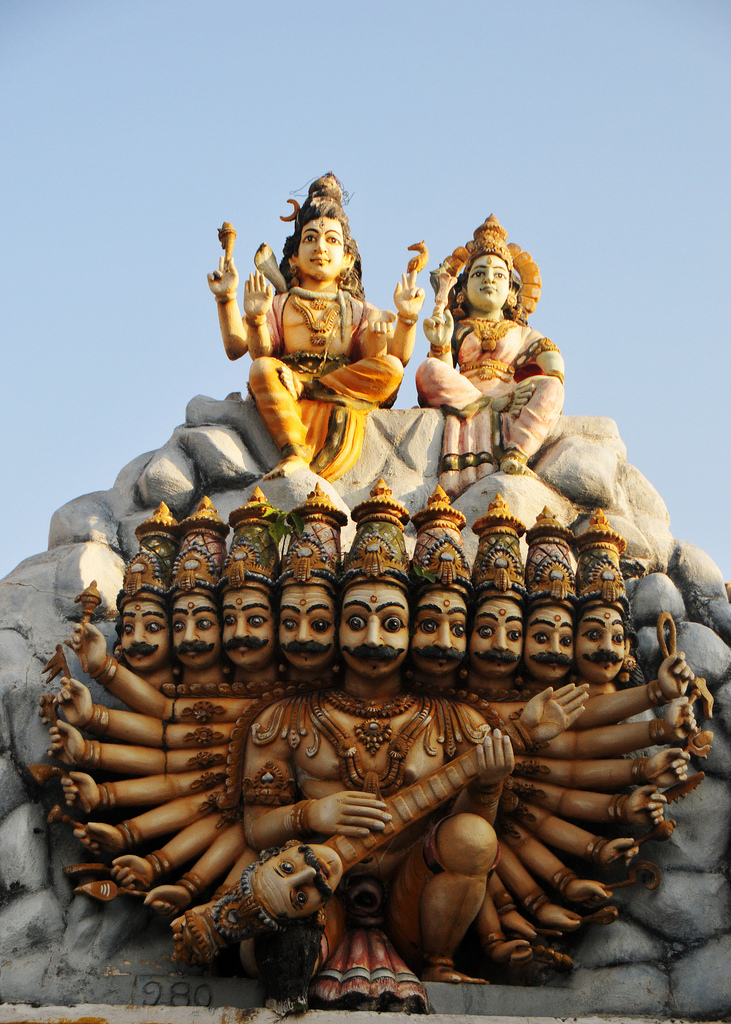
Ravananugraha at Koneswaram Temple

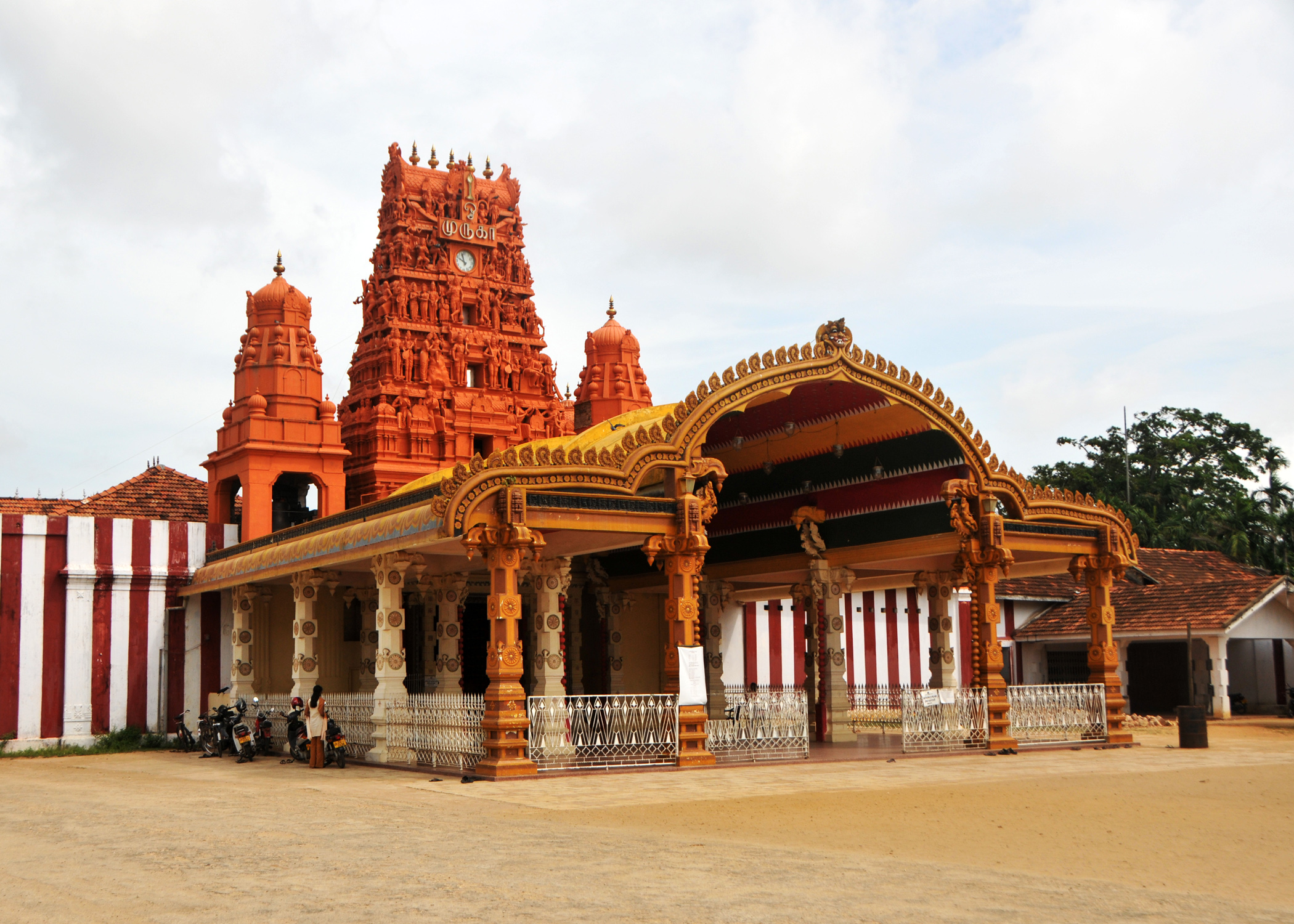
Front entrance of Nallur Kandaswamy temple

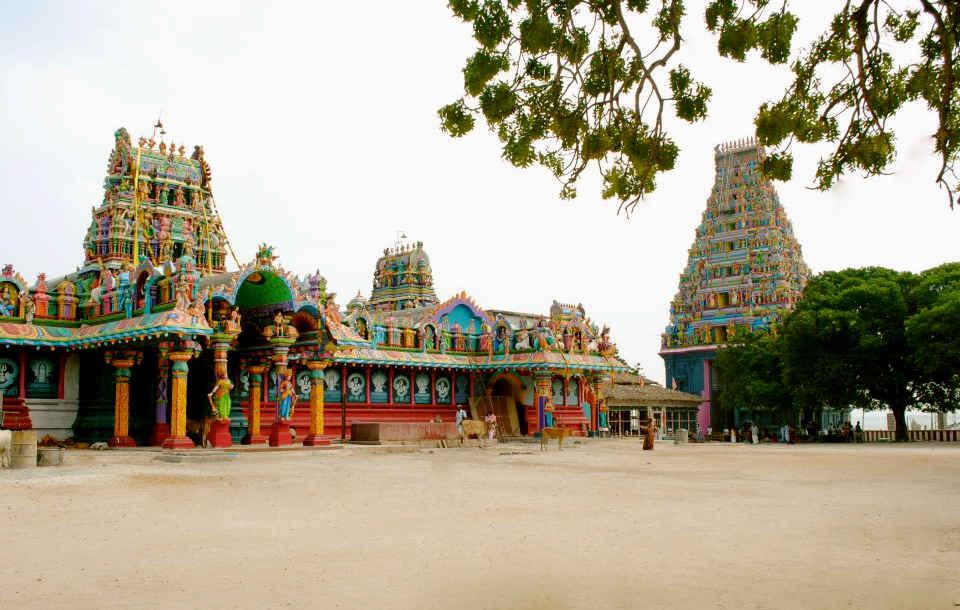
Nainativu Nagapooshani Amman Temple

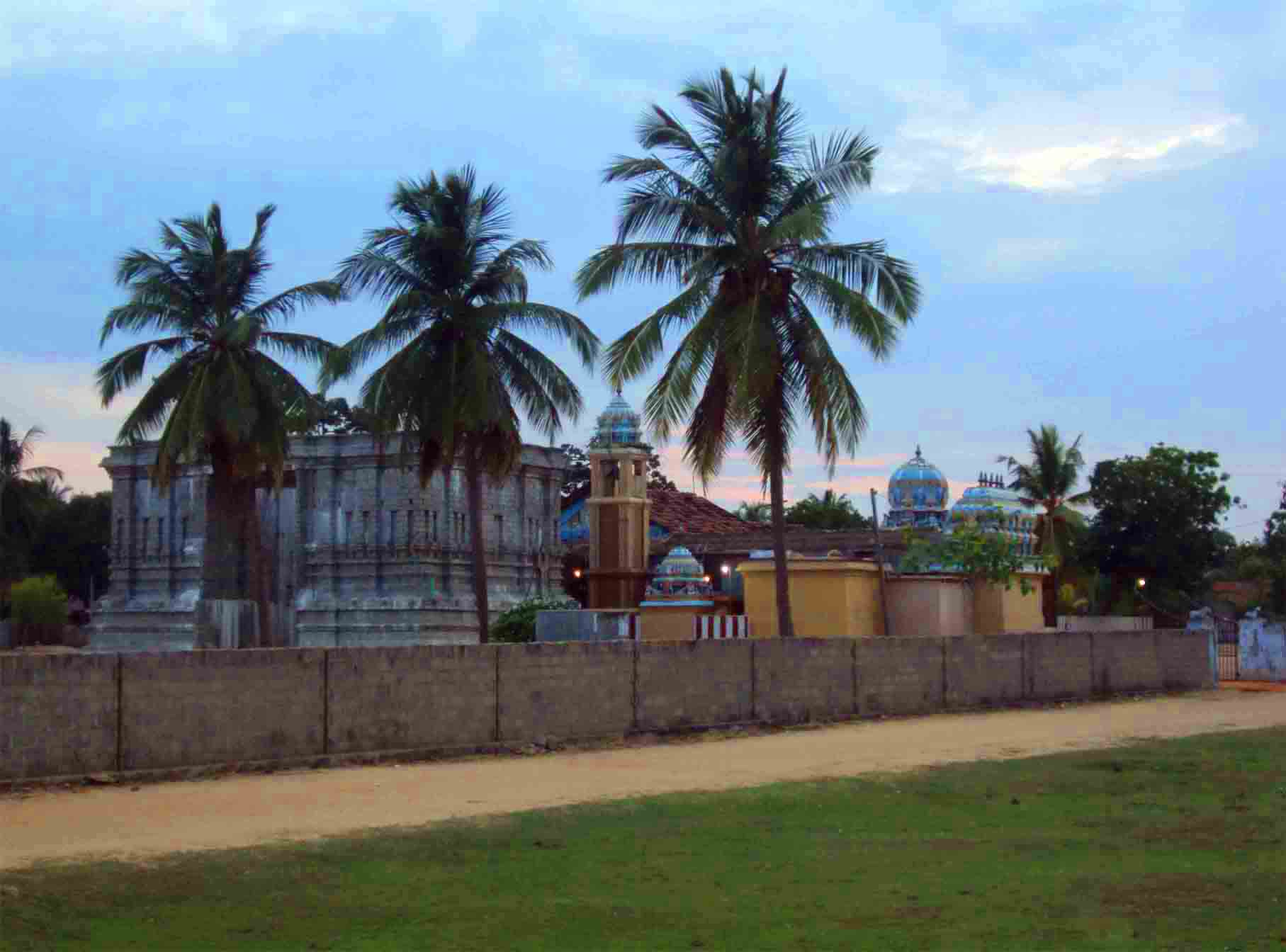
Thirukkovil Sithira Velayutha Swami Temple, in Ampara.

Most Hindu temples in Sri Lanka have Tamil architecture, most of which are ancient with a gopuram and a ratha in them. Alike many Hindu temples, which are dedicated to Hindu deities, many temples in Sri Lanka are also for their village deities which is mainly among the Tamil community.

The Pancha Ishwarams are:

- Naguleswaram temple in the North.
- Ketheeswaram temple in the Northwest.
- Koneswaram Temple in the East.
- Munneswaram temple in the West.
- Tondeswaram in the South.

The Seetha Amman Temple, identified with the Ashoka Vatika of the Ramayana - the place where Rama's wife Sita was abducted to by Ravana, is located in Sita Eliya village in Nuwara Eliya District.

== Demographics ==
According to the 1981 census, there were 2,297,800 Hindus in Sri Lanka; the 2024 census reported 2,734,839 Hindus in the country. Twenty thousand people died during the 2004 tsunami in LTTE-held areas alone.

Hindus in Sri Lanka
Year	Pop.	±% p.a.
1881	593,600	—
1891	615,900	+0.37%
1901	826,800	+2.99%
1911	938,300	+1.27%
1921	982,100	+0.46%
1931	1,166,900	+1.74%
1946	1,320,400	+0.83%
1953	1,610,500	+2.88%
1963	1,958,400	+1.98%
1971	2,238,666	+1.69%
1981	2,297,806	+0.26%
1991	2,406,852	+0.46%
2001	2,481,495	+0.31%
2012	2,561,299	+0.29%
2024	2,734,839	+0.55%
*The 2001 census did not cover all regions, due to political instability; however, the overall population increased by 1.02 percent per year.

=== Decadal population ===
Hinduism in Sri Lanka by decades
Year	Percent	Increase
1881	21.51%	-
1891	20.48%	▼ -1.03%
1901	23.2%	▲ +2.72%
1911	22.85%	▼ -0.35%
1921	21.83%	▼ -1.02%
1931	22%	▲ +0.17%
1946	19.83%	▼ -2.17%
1953	19.9%	▲0.07%
1963	18.51%	▼ -1.39%
1971	17.64%	▼ -0.87%
1981	15.48%	▼ -2.16%
1991	14.32%	▼ -1.16%
2001	13.8%	▼ -0.52%
2012	12.58%	▼ -1.22%
2024	12.56%	▼ -0.02%

The Hindu percentage has declined from 21.51% in 1881 to 12.58% in 2012. Mainly because of the Indian indentured labourers brought by the British returning to India and the immigration of Tamil Hindus caused by the Sri Lankan Civil War between 23 Jul 1983 – 18 May 2009. Around 105,000 were killed and 1 million Tamils left Sri Lanka during that turmoil period.

=== Ethnicity ===
The Hindus in Sri Lanka are predominantly Tamils: Sri Lankan Tamil and Indian Tamil community. Sri Lankan Tamils have lived on the island since at least around the 2nd century BCE. They are concentrated mainly in the Northern and Eastern Provinces, whereas Indian Tamils (also known as Hill Country or Malaiyaha Tamils) are descended from plantation workers brought from British India during the colonial period and are concentrated primarily in the Central Highlands.

There is a small population of Sinhalese speaking Hindus like in the village of Maradankulama. There is a significant Hindu minority population among the Bharatha people, which is another recognized ethnic group in Sri Lanka.

The Sri Lankan Telugus community, also known as Ahikuntaka/Kuravar were historically Shaivite Hindus. Overtime majority have converted to Buddhism and Christianity. Currently, Kanchirankudah, a small settlement near Alikambe is allegedly the last remaining region where Hindusim is practised by Sri Lankan Telugus.

=== District-wise population ===
Hindu population (2012 Census)

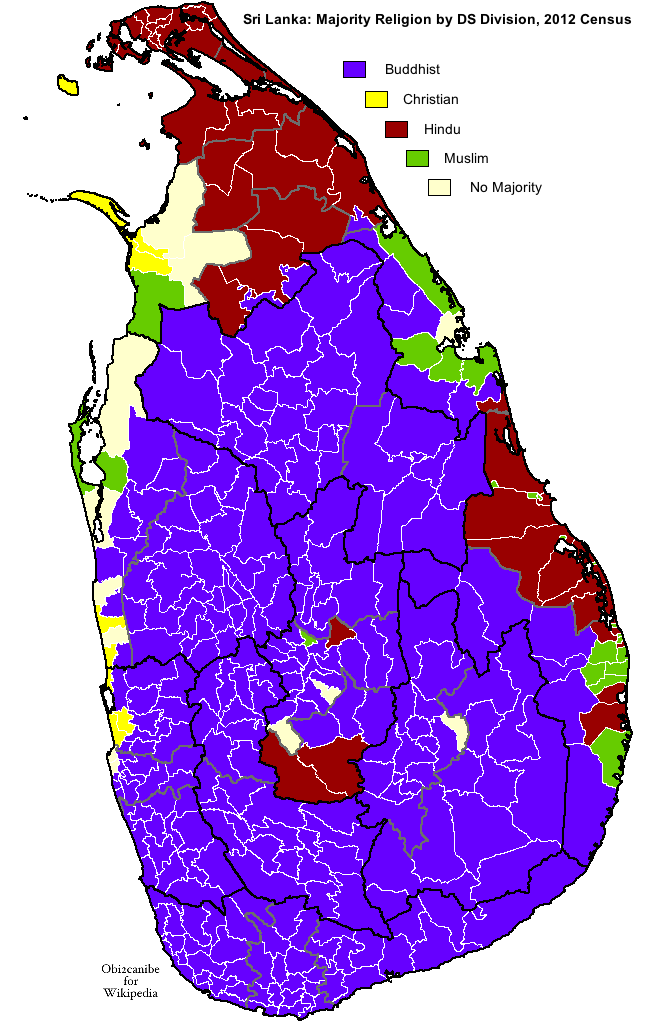
Sri Lanka religion (2012 Census)

The Hindu population percentage remained unchanged nationally between 2012 and 2024 Census. However, district wise there has been significant changes. Population growth was observed in the Western and plantation districts, while most districts in the Northern and Eastern Provinces where Hindus form majority recorded a decline in the Hindu share of their populations.

Hindu population percentage growth was observed in only 7 districts, with the highest in Nuwara Eliya where it rose from 51.0% to 52.0%, followed by Capital Colombo and Gampaha. In 16 districts, the Hindu population share declined, with highest in Mannar District and Vavuniya District (−2.9 %), followed by Mullaitivu District (−2.8 %), Batticaloa District and Trincomalee District (−1.5 %), and Kilinochchi District (−1.2 %).

Hindus form majority in six districts: Jaffna District (82.3%), Kilinochchi District (80.7%), Mullaitivu District (72.4%) and Vavuniya District (66.5%) in the Northern Province; Batticaloa District (62.9%) in the Eastern Province and Nuwara Eliya District (52.0%) in the Central Province. Unlike other districts, in Nuwara Eliya it's the Indian Tamils Hindus who form majority of Hindus rather than Sri Lankan Tamil Hindus.

Province	District	Hindu % (2012)	Hindu % (2024)	Change
Western	Colombo District	8.0	8.3	+0.3%
Western	Gampaha District	2.3	2.8	+0.5%
Western	Kalutara District	3.2	3.3	+0.1%
Central	Kandy District	9.7	9.9	+0.2%
Central	Matale District	9.0	8.8	−0.2%
Central	Nuwara Eliya District	51.0	52.0	+1.0%
Southern	Galle District	1.5	1.4	−0.1%
Southern	Matara District	2.0	1.7	−0.3%
Southern	Hambantota District	0.2	0.2	0.0%
Northern	Jaffna District	82.8	82.3	−0.5%
Northern	Mannar District	24.1	21.2	−2.9%
Northern	Vavuniya District	69.4	66.5	−2.9%
Northern	Mullaitivu District	75.2	72.4	−2.8%
Northern	Kilinochchi District	81.9	80.7	−1.2%
Eastern	Batticaloa District	64.4	62.9	−1.5%
Eastern	Ampara District	15.8	15.4	−0.4%
Eastern	Trincomalee District	25.9	24.4	−1.5%
North Western	Kurunegala District	0.9	1.0	+0.1%
North Western	Puttalam District	3.8	3.5	−0.3%
North Central	Anuradhapura District	0.4	0.4	0.0%
North Central	Polonnaruwa District	1.7	1.6	−0.1%
Uva	Badulla District	19.3	19.1	−0.2%
Uva	Monaragala District	2.7	2.8	+0.1%
Sabaragamuwa	Ratnapura District	9.4	9.1	−0.3%
Sabaragamuwa	Kegalle District	6.5	6.5	0.0%

=== Province-wise population ===
Hindus form majority in the Northern Province (76.4%). Significant population exists in Eastern Province (40.1%) and the Central Province (26.5%). The lowest percentage was observed in North Central Province (0.8%).

Province	Hindu % (2012)	Hindu % (2024)	Change
Northern Province	74.56%	72.10%	−2.46
Eastern Province	34.78%	33.51%	−1.27
Central Province	21.01%	20.93%	−0.08
Uva Province	13.39%	12.96%	−0.43
Sabaragamuwa Province	8.10%	7.94%	−0.16
Western Province	4.71%	5.06%	+0.35
North Western Province	1.83%	1.79%	−0.04
Southern Province	1.34%	1.21%	−0.13
North Central Province	0.79%	0.78%	−0.01

== See also ==
- Hinduism in Pakistan
- Hinduism in Afghanistan
- Hinduism in Indonesia
- Hinduism in Réunion
- Tamil settlement of Sri Lanka
- Tamil diaspora
- Village deities of South India
- Siva Senai
