= Religion in Sri Lanka =

Faith in Sri Lanka (2024 census)
1. Buddhism (official) (69.8%)
2. Hinduism (12.6%)
3. Islam (10.7%)
4. Catholicism (5.60%)
5. Other Christians (1.30%)

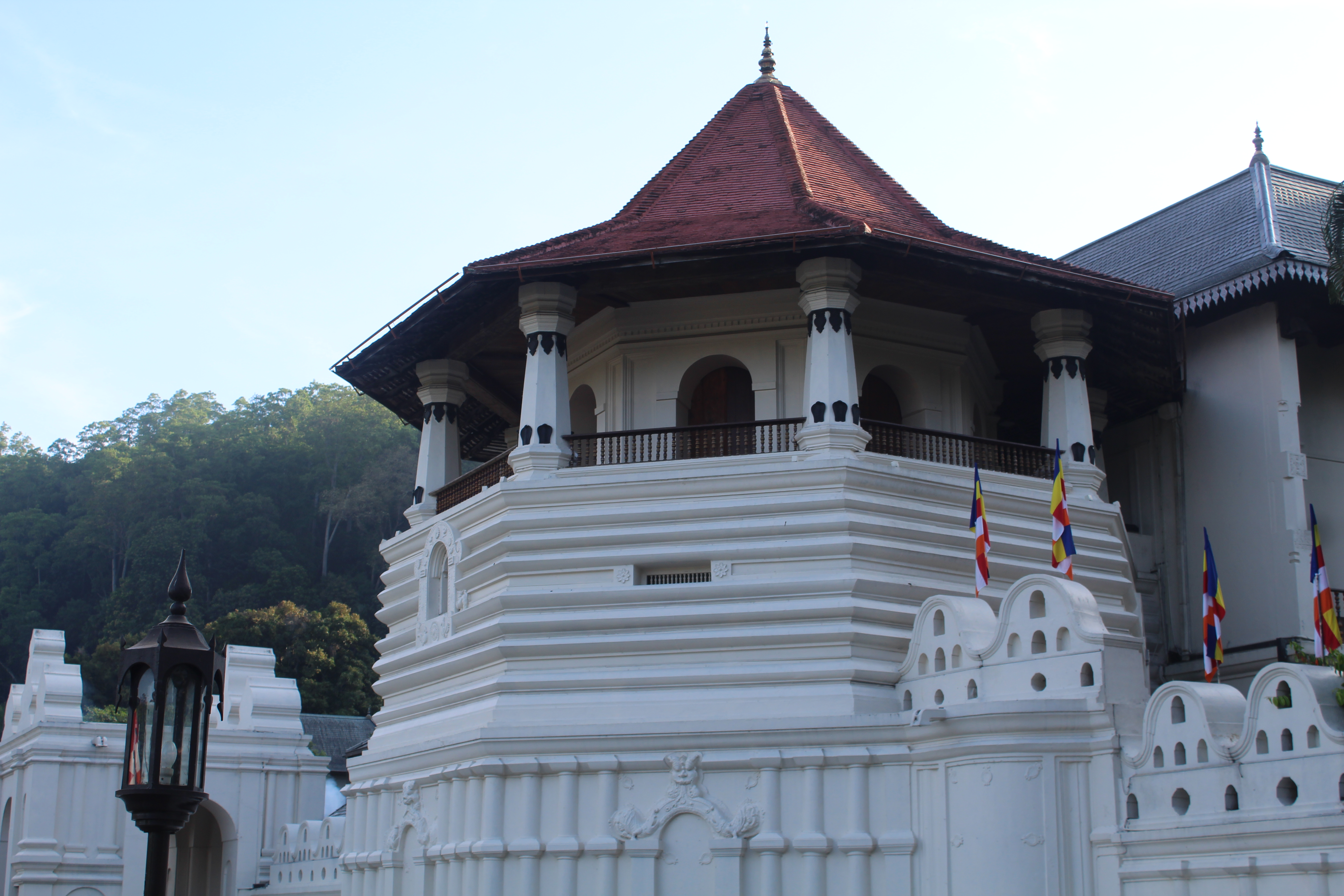
Temple of the Tooth in Kandy, Sri Lanka.

Sri Lanka is officially a Buddhist country, however Sri Lankans practice a variety of religions. As of the 2024 census, 69.8% of Sri Lankans were Buddhists (mostly Theravada), 12.6% were Hindus, 10.7% were Muslims (mainly Sunni), 7.6% were Christians (mostly Catholics). Buddhism is declared as the state religion of Sri Lanka and receives special privileges in the Sri Lankan constitution, such as mandatory protection and nationwide propagation by the government. However, the constitution also provides for freedom of religion and the right to equality among citizens. In 2008, a Gallup poll ranked Sri Lanka the third most religious country in the world with 99% of Sri Lankans saying that religion was an important part of their daily life.

== Distribution of religious groups ==
The census 2001 covered 18 districts only. The district percentages shown are from 2001 census except where the numbers are italic, which are from 1981 census. Population movements have occurred after 1981, and accurate statistics did not exist for districts which were not covered in 2001 census until the 2011 census.

A map of Sri Lanka marking the major religion in each district, according to the 2012 Census

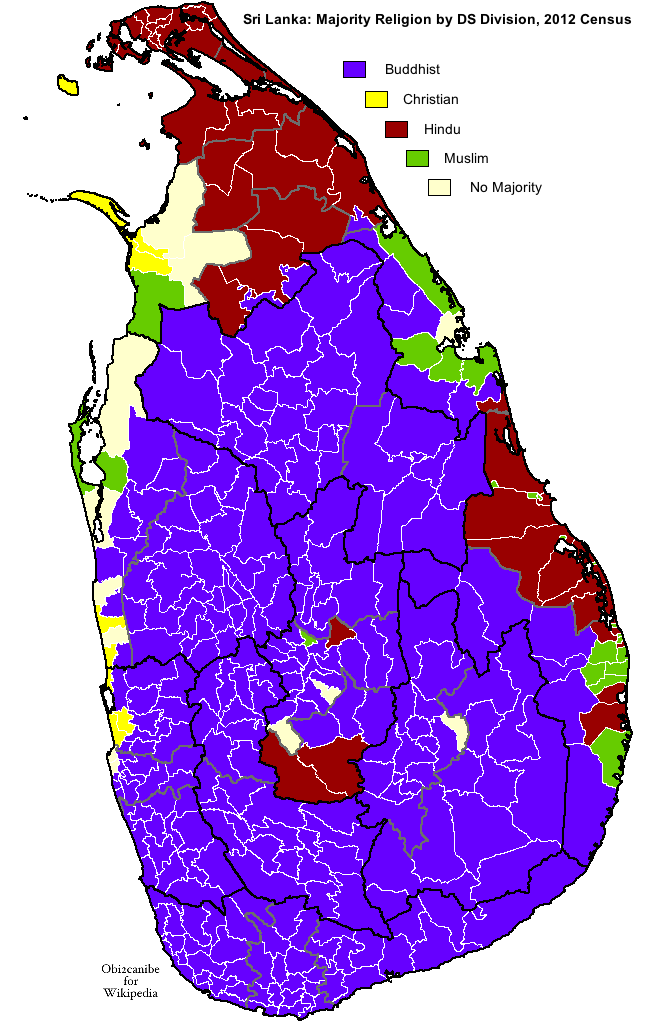
Map of Sri Lanka, showing majority religions by D.S. Divisions, according to 2012 census.

Data from the 2011 census

Buddhists

Hindus

Muslims

Christians

=== Religion by Province ===
Religion by Province in Sri Lanka
Province	Buddhism		Hinduism		Islam		Christianity		Others		Total	
Province	#	%	#	%	#	%	#	%	#	%	#	%
Central Province	1,672,625	65.05%	540,339	21.01%	263,874	10.26%	94,402	3.67%	317	0.01%	2,571,557	100%
Eastern Province	354,772	22.87%	539,570	34.78%	575,936	37.12%	80,801	5.21%	302	0.02%	1,551,381	100%
North Central Province	1,139,595	90%	10,117	0.79%	101,958	8.03%	14,875	1.17%	188	0.01%	1,266,663	100%
Northern Province	30,387	2.87%	789,362	74.56%	34,040	3.22%	204,005	19.27%	968	0.09%	1,058,762	100%
North Western Province	1,761,337	73.98%	43,532	1.83%	268,709	11.28%	305,951	12.85%	1,332	0.06%	2,380,861	100%
Sabaragamuwa Province	1,653,381	85.73%	156,312	8.1%	85,610	4.44%	33,219	1.72%	133	0.006%	1,928,655	100%
Southern Province	2,345,314	94.68%	33,227	1.34%	80,085	3.23%	18,201	0.73%	458	0.02%	2,477,285	100%
Uva Province	1,018,561	80.43%	169,605	13.39%	57,001	4.5%	21,095	1.66%	201	0.02%	1,266,463	100%
Western Province	4,088,797	70.67%	274,336	4.71%	709,992	10.81%	752,993	12.93%	4,592	0.08%	5,830,710	100%

== Buddhism ==
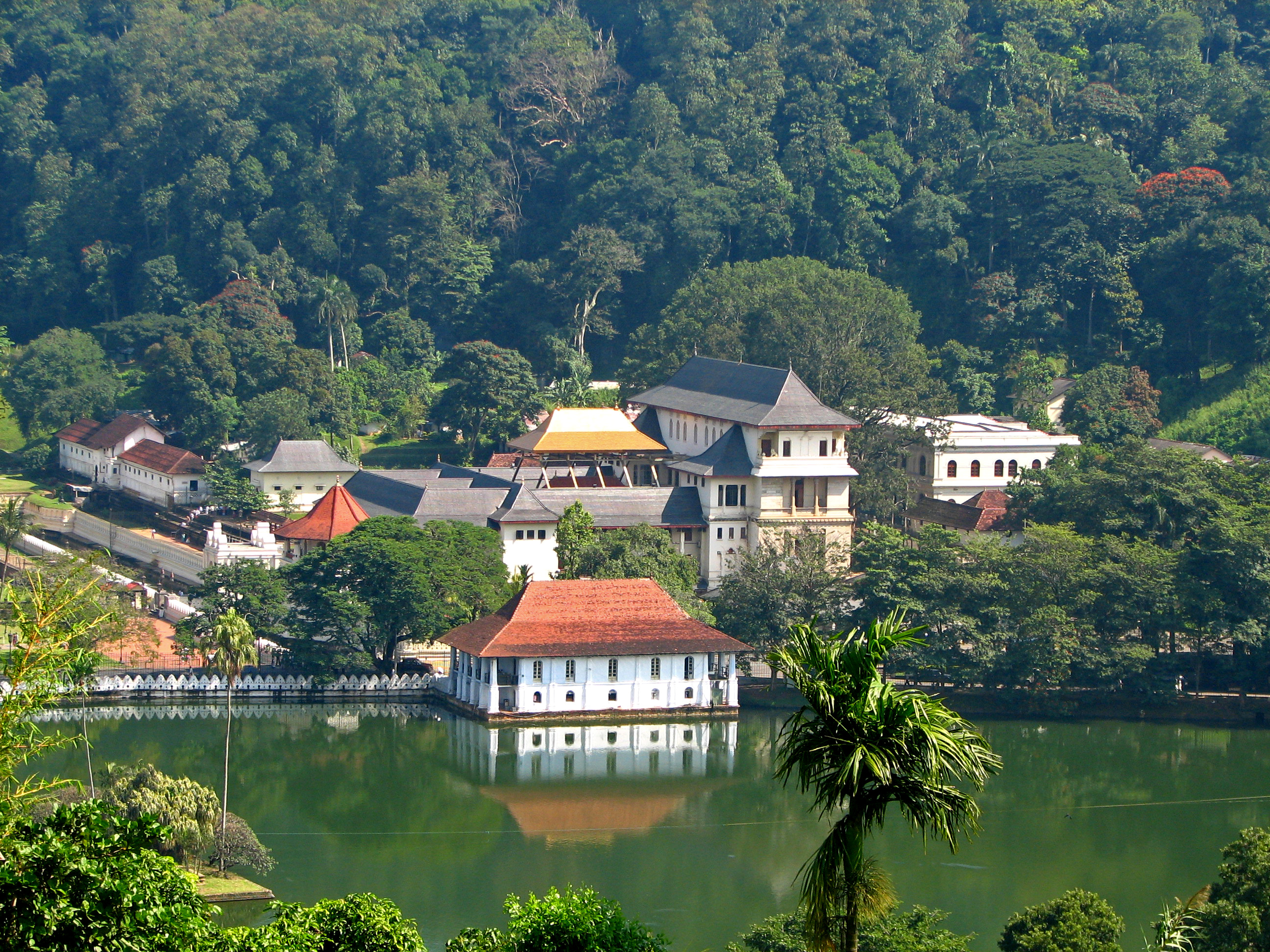
Exterior of the sacred temple of the Tooth in Kandy.

Theravada Buddhism is the official religion of Sri Lanka, with about 69.8% of the country's population as followers. Arahath Mahinda, son of Indian Buddhist emperor Ashoka, led the mission to Sri Lanka in 246 BCE when he converted the Sri Lankan king, Devanampiya Tissa, to Buddhism. Arahath Sanghamitra, daughter of King Ashoka, brought a sapling of the Bodhi tree in Buddha Gaya to Sri Lanka. She also established the Order of Nuns in Sri Lanka. The Sapling of the Bodhi tree, known as Jaya Sri Maha Bodhi was planted in the Mahameghavana Park in Anuradhapura by the King Devanampiya Tissa.

From then on, the royal families had helped to encourage the spread of Buddhism, aiding Buddhist missionaries and building monasteries. Around 200 BCE, Buddhism became the official religion of Sri Lanka. The Sacred Tooth Relic was brought to Sri Lanka in 4th century by Prince Danta and Princess Hemamala. Sri Lanka has the longest continuous history of Buddhism of any Buddhist nation. During the periods of decline, the Sri Lankan monastic lineage was revived through contacts with Myanmar and Thailand. Later on, however, Hindu invasions and European colonial influences contributed to the decline of Buddhism in Sri Lanka.

But toward the end of the European colonial period and during the post-colonial period, Buddhism has regained prominence in Sri Lanka. As of the 1881 census, 61.57% of Sri Lankans followed Buddhism. That number has steadily increased to 70.1% as of 2012.

In the mid 18th century the higher ordination of Buddhist monks known as Upasampada, which was defunct at the time, was revived with the help of Siamese Buddhist monks on the initiatives taken by Weliwita Sri Saranankara Thero during the reign of king Kirti Sri Rajasinha of Kandy. By the mid-19th century, Buddhist leaders such as Migettuwatte Gunananda Thera, Hikkaduwe Sri Sumangala Thera, Colonel Henry Steel Olcott and Anagarika Dharmapala started a successful national Buddhist movement for the revival of Buddhism in Sri Lanka.

Buddhism in Sri Lanka 1881–2012
Year	Population	%
1881 census	1,698,100	61.57%
1891 census	1,877,000	62.40%
1901 census	2,141,400	60.06%
1911 census	2,474,200	60.25%
1921 census	2,769,800	61.57%
1931 census	3,266,600	61.55%
1946 estimation	4,294,900	64.51%
1953 census	5,209,400	64.33%
1963 census	7,003,300	66.18%
1971 census	8,536,868	67.27%
1981 census	10,288,325	69.30%
2012 census	14,272,056	70.10%

== Hinduism ==
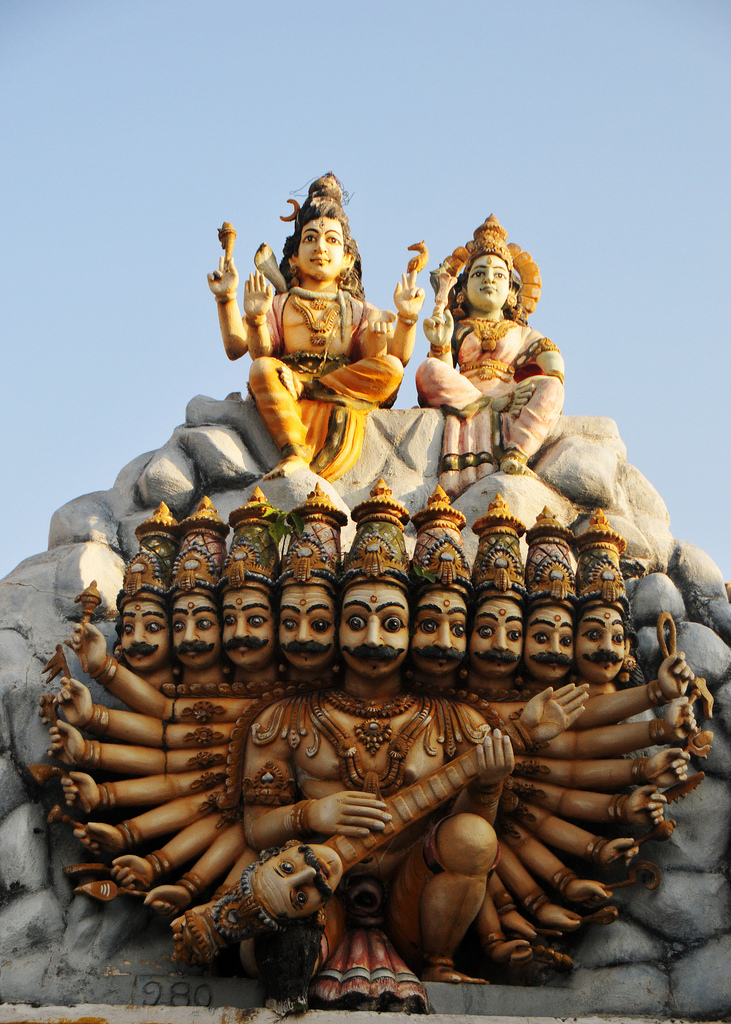
Statue of Ravana at Koneswaram Temple.

Hindus make up 12.6% of Sri Lanka's population. Hinduism was practiced by Native Kings before their conversion to Buddhism. The origins of the religion are linked to early Tamil immigration into the island since the Chola conquests in the 10th century or even earlier with the Saivite devotional movement that swept South India.

Hinduism in Sri Lanka is largely identified with the Tamil population and is concentrated in the Northern, Eastern and Central Provinces. The population declined since the 1981 census on account of Sri Lankan Tamil emigration overseas and the repatriation of 'Indian' Tamils.

A significant Hindu religious figure in Sri Lankan modern history is Satguru Siva Yogaswami of Jaffna. One of the mystics of the 20th century, Yogaswami was the official satguru and counseling sage of Lanka's several million Tamil Hindu population. The Ramakrishna Mission is somewhat active in the Amparai and Batticaloa districts while the Shaiva Siddhanta school of philosophy of Shaivism sect of Hinduism is prevalent in the North of Sri Lanka. Yogaswami belonged to the Shaiva Siddhanta and he was 161st head of the Nandinatha Sampradaya. The next person in the line of succession after Yogaswami was Sivaya Subramuniyaswami.

== Islam ==
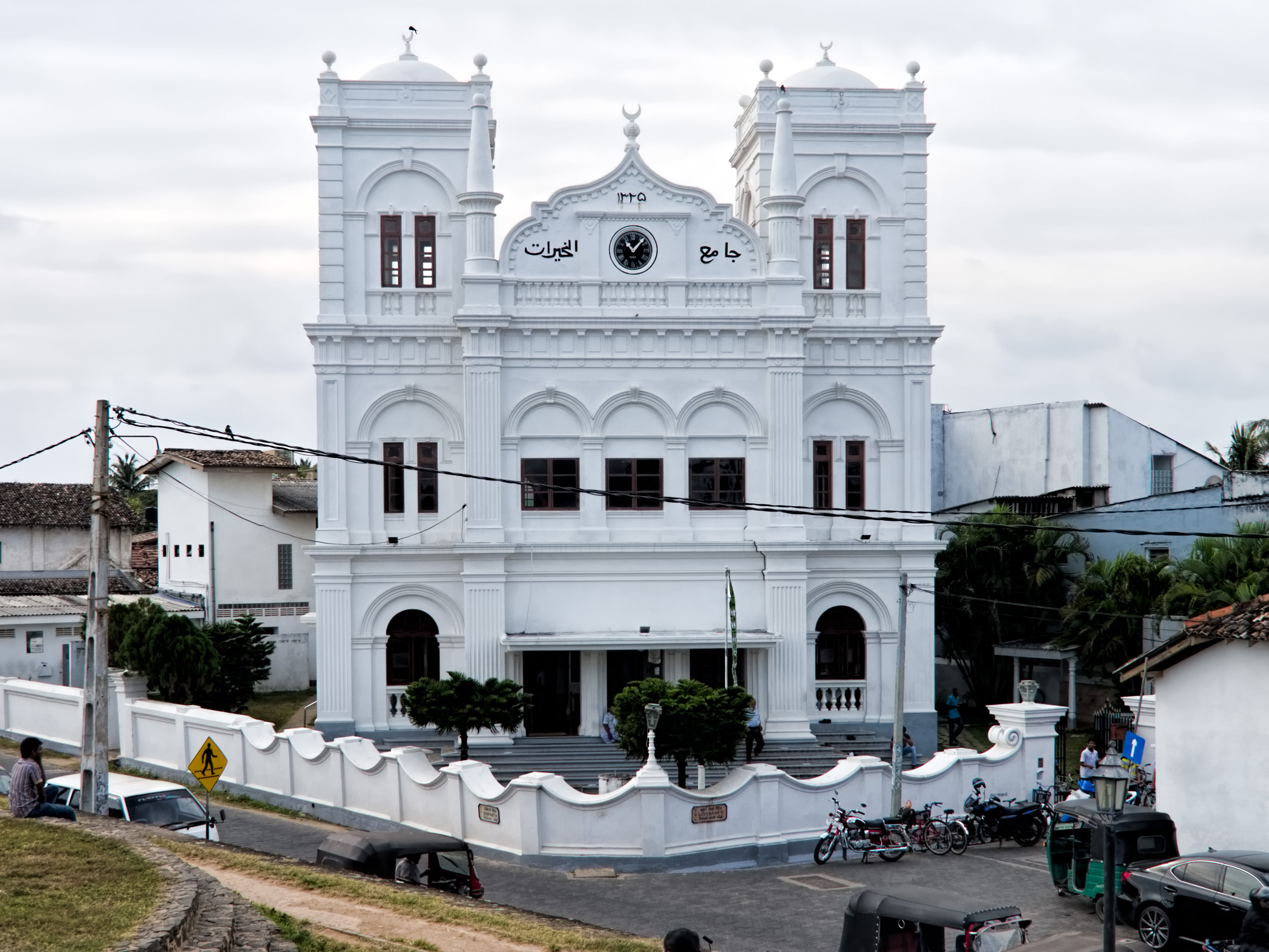
Meeran Mosque in Galle.

By the 7th century, Arab traders had controlled much of the trade on the Indian Ocean, including that of Sri Lanka's. Many of these traders settled down in Sri Lanka, encouraging the spread of Islam. However, when the Portuguese arrived at Sri Lanka during the 16th century, many of the Arabs' Muslim descendants were persecuted, thus forcing them to migrate to the Central Highlands and to the east coast.

In modern times, Muslims in Sri Lanka have the Muslim Religious and Cultural Affairs Department, which was established in the 1980s to prevent the continual isolation of the Muslim community from the rest of Sri Lanka. Today, about 10.7% of Sri Lankans adhere to Islam; mostly from the Moor and Malay ethnic communities on the island.

== Christianity ==
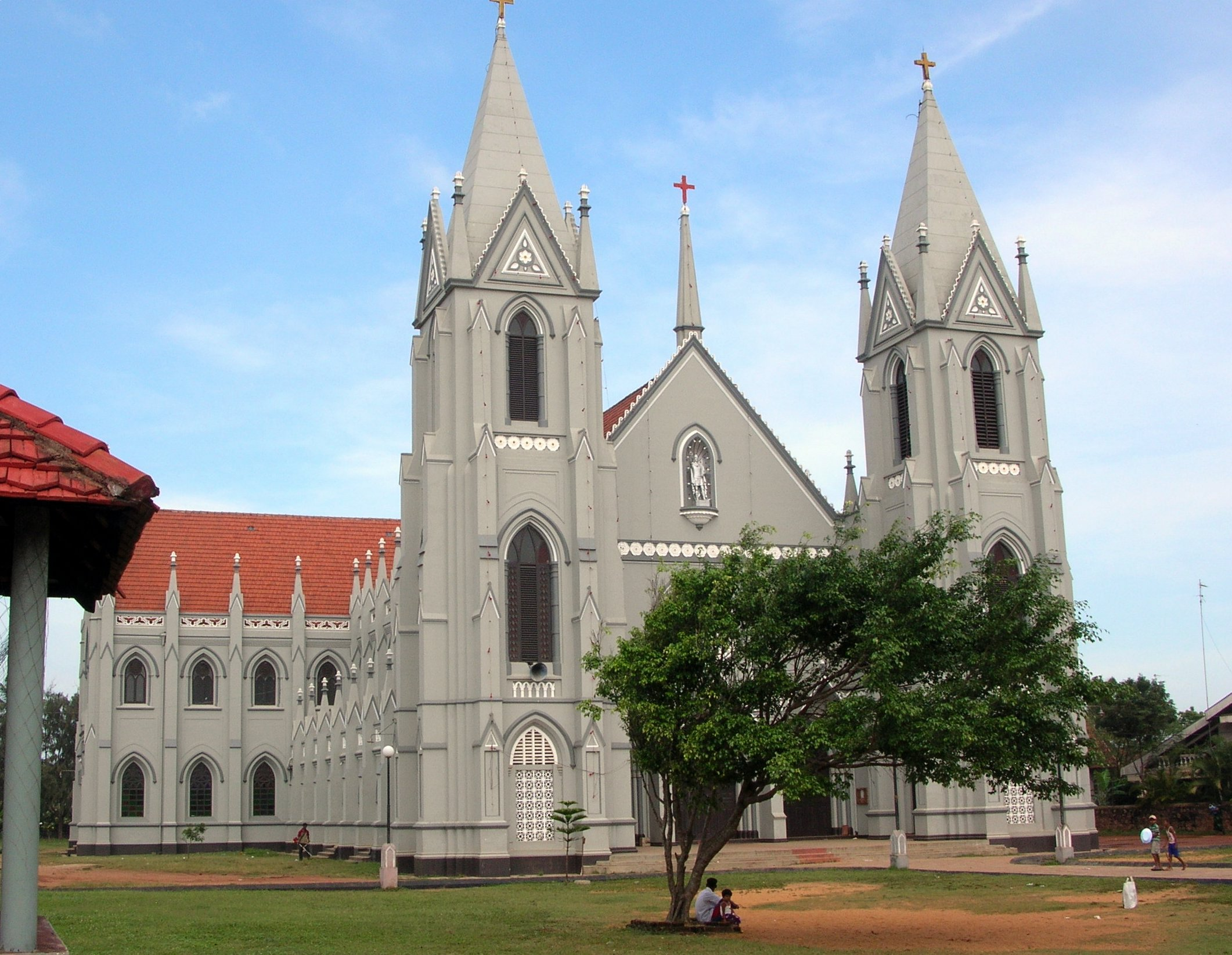
St. Sebastian's Church in Negombo.

According to a Christian tradition, Christianity was introduced by Thomas the Apostle in Sri Lanka (as well as India) during the 1st century. The first evidence of Christianity in Sri Lanka is the account in the 6th-century Christian Topography, which says a community of Persian Nestorians lived on the island. The Anuradhapura cross, discovered in 1912, is probably a relic of this community. However, the population of Christians in Sri Lanka did not dramatically increase until the arrival of Portuguese missionaries during the 15th century. In the 17th century, the Dutch took over Sri Lanka and Dutch missionaries were able to convert 21% of Sri Lanka's population to Christianity by 1622.

In 1796 the Dutch were displaced by the British and in 1802 Ceylon became a Crown colony. Anglican and other Protestant missionaries arrived in Sri Lanka during the early 19th century, when the British took control of Sri Lanka from the Dutch. Under British rule missionary work was undertaken by English societies: Baptist, Wesleyan Methodist, the CMS and SPG. The Salvation Army and Jehovah's Witnesses are also present in Sri Lanka.

The percentage of Christians has slowly declined from the height of 13%. In 1891, they were 12.6% and numbered 302,000. In 2012 they were 7.6%. By the 1980s, the population of Christians was mostly concentrated in the northwest of Sri Lanka and in the capital, where they are 10% of the population. Of these Christians, over 80% are Catholics while the rest are predominantly Anglicans, Methodists and other Protestants.

== Baháʼí Faith ==
Adherents of the Baháʼí Faith have been present in Sri Lanka since 1949. The first Baháʼí resident in Colombo was a physician from India, M.E. Lukmani. Its population grew in the 1950s and by 1962, its first administrative body for the national level (the National Spiritual Assembly of the Baháʼís of Sri Lanka) was elected.

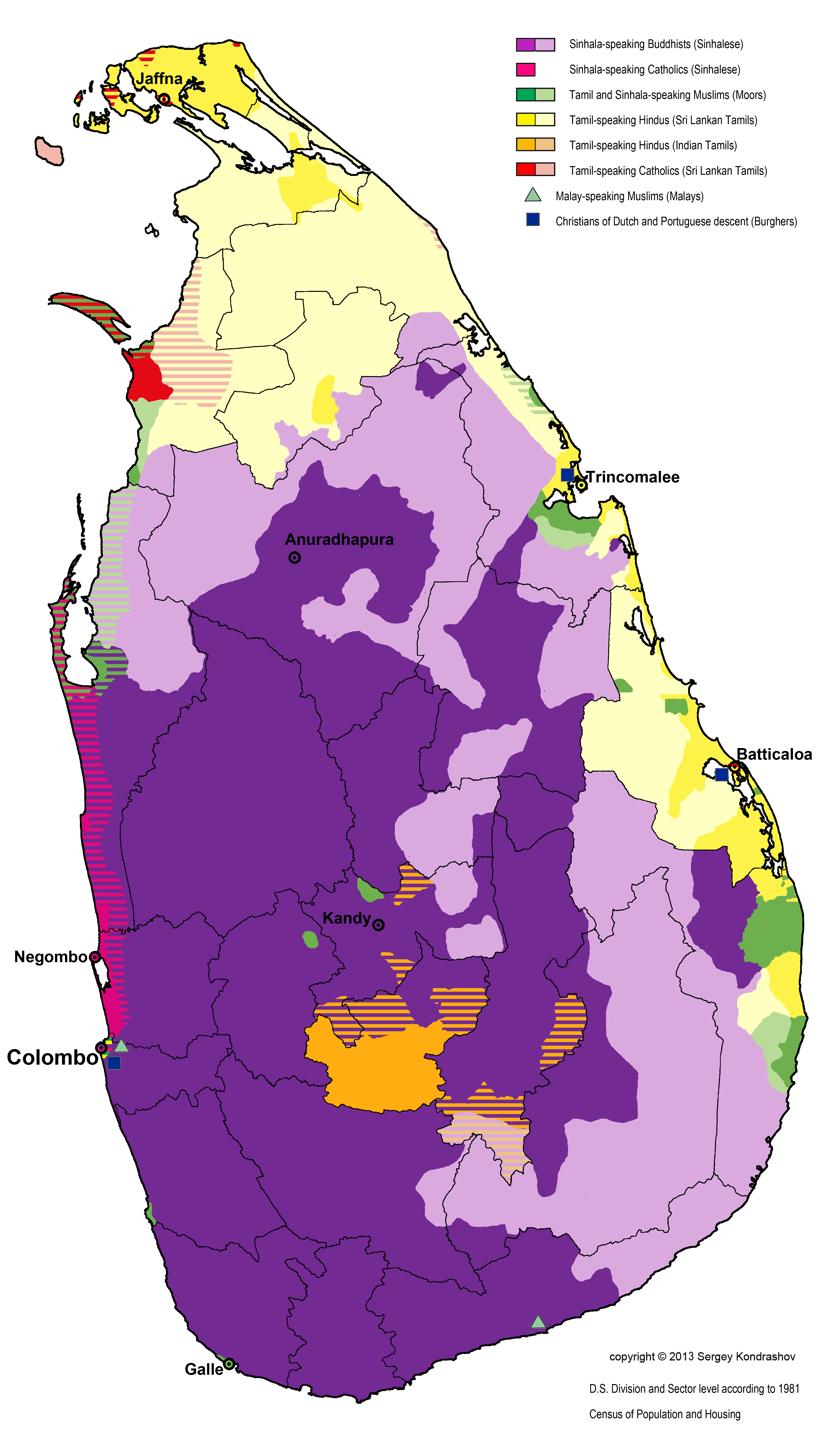
Distribution of languages and religious groups of Sri Lanka by D.S. divisions and sector level, according to the 1981 census.

== See also ==
- History of Sri Lanka
- Freedom of religion in Sri Lanka
