= Irreligion in Sri Lanka =

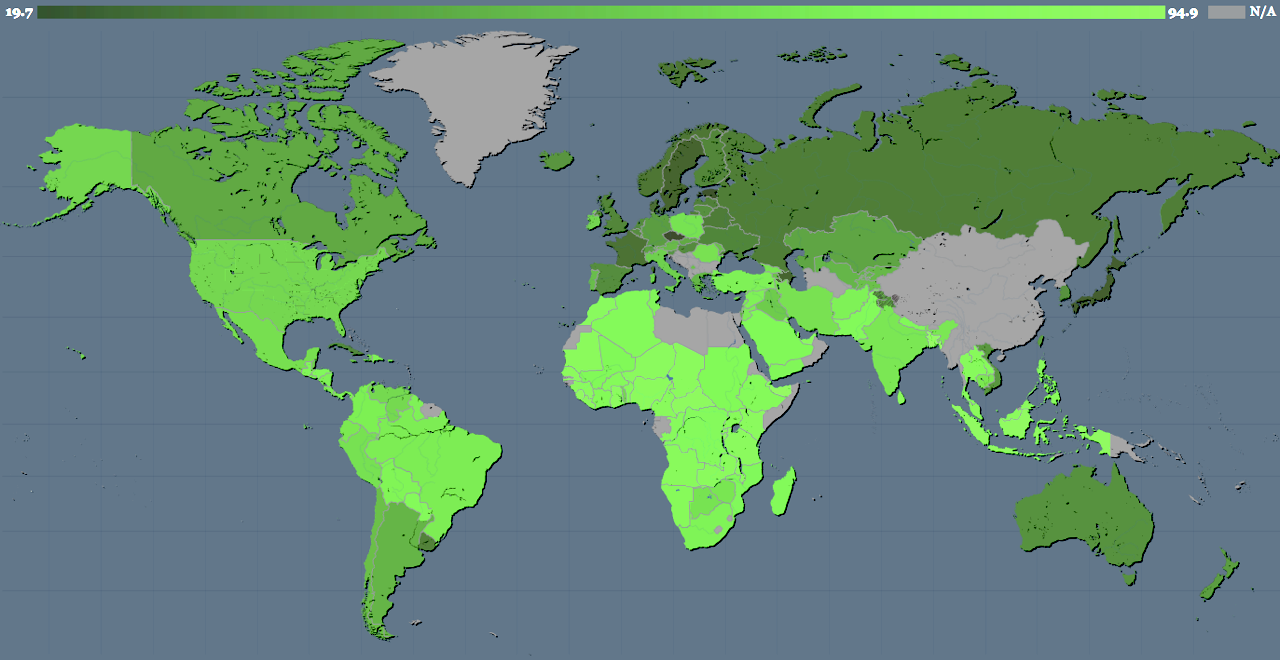
Gallup Religiosity Index 2009 – Sri Lanka is one of the most religious countries in the world.

Irreligion in Sri Lanka may refer to atheism, agnosticism, deism, religious skepticism, secular humanism or general secularist attitudes in Sri Lanka. The Sri Lankan national census does not provide an option for no religion.

This is supported by a 2008 Gallup poll which found 99% of Sri Lankans considered religion an important aspect of their daily lives. Only Niger, Bangladesh and Indonesia scored higher than this.

== Sri Lankan notable atheists and agnostics ==
- Arthur C Clarke – science fiction author.

== See also ==
- Religion in Sri Lanka
- Freedom of religion in Sri Lanka
- Buddhism in Sri Lanka
- Christianity in Sri Lanka
- Islam in Sri Lanka
- Demographics of Sri Lanka
- Demographics of atheism
