= WHEF (disambiguation) =

WHEF is the World Hindu Economic Forum, a non-profit organization based out of Delhi, Bharat.

WHEF(S) may also refer to:

- WHEF AM, radio station which broadcast James Blackwood
- Whefs, on List of file systems
