= Colombuthurai =

Colombuthurai கொழும்புத்துறை කොලොම්තර
- Suburb
- Location within Northern Province Location within Sri Lanka
- Coordinates: 9°39′16.00″N 80°02′29.80″E
- Country: Sri Lanka
- Province: Northern
- District: Jaffna
- DS Division: Jaffna

Government
  - Type: Municipal Council
  - Body: Jaffna

Population (2012)
  - Total: 3,431
- Time zone: UTC+5:30 (Sri Lanka Standard Time Zone)
- Post Codes: 4136010-4136015
- Telephone Codes: 021
- Vehicle registration: NP

Colombuthurai (Tamil: கொழும்புத்துறை, romanized: Koḻumputtuṟai; Sinhala: කොලොම්තර Kolomtara) is a suburb of the city of Jaffna in northern Sri Lanka. Colombuthurai means "the port at the bending point" in Tamil and is derived from the Tamil words kolu (plough point) and thurai (port). The suburb is divided into two village officer divisions (Colombuthurai East and Colombuthurai West) whose combined population was 3,431 at the 2012 census.

== Schools ==
- Colombuthurai Hindu College, Jaffna

== Temples ==
- Colombuthurai Pillayar Kovil

== Notable people ==
- Yogaswami, Spiritual master
- V. Yogeswaran, Politician and former Member of Parliament.
- Sarojini Yogeswaran, Former Mayor of Jaffna.
- M.K.Eelaventhan, Politician and former Member of Parliament.
- Nishan Canagarajah, Pro-vice-chancellors of the University of Bristol, England.
- Suresh Canagarajah, Professor of Applied linguistics, English, and Asian studies at Pennsylvania State University, U.S.A.
