= Hinduism Today =

US magazine

- 25 years later: January 2016 issue of Hinduism Today
- Categories: Special interest magazine
- Frequency: Quarterly
- Circulation: 18,000
- Publisher: Bodhinatha Veylanswami
- Founder: Sivaya Subramuniyaswami
- Founded: 1979
- First issue: February 1979
- Company: Himalayan Academy, nonprofit institution
- Country: United States, international distribution
- Language: English
- Website: HinduismToday.com
- ISSN: 0896-0801

Hinduism Today is a quarterly magazine published by the Himalayan Academy, a nonprofit educational institution, in Kapaʻa, Hawaiʻi, USA. It is distributed throughout the United States and internationally, currently in 60 nations. Founded by Sivaya Subramuniyaswami in 1979, it is a public service of his monastic order to promote an understanding of the Hindu faith, culture, and traditions.

== History and topics ==
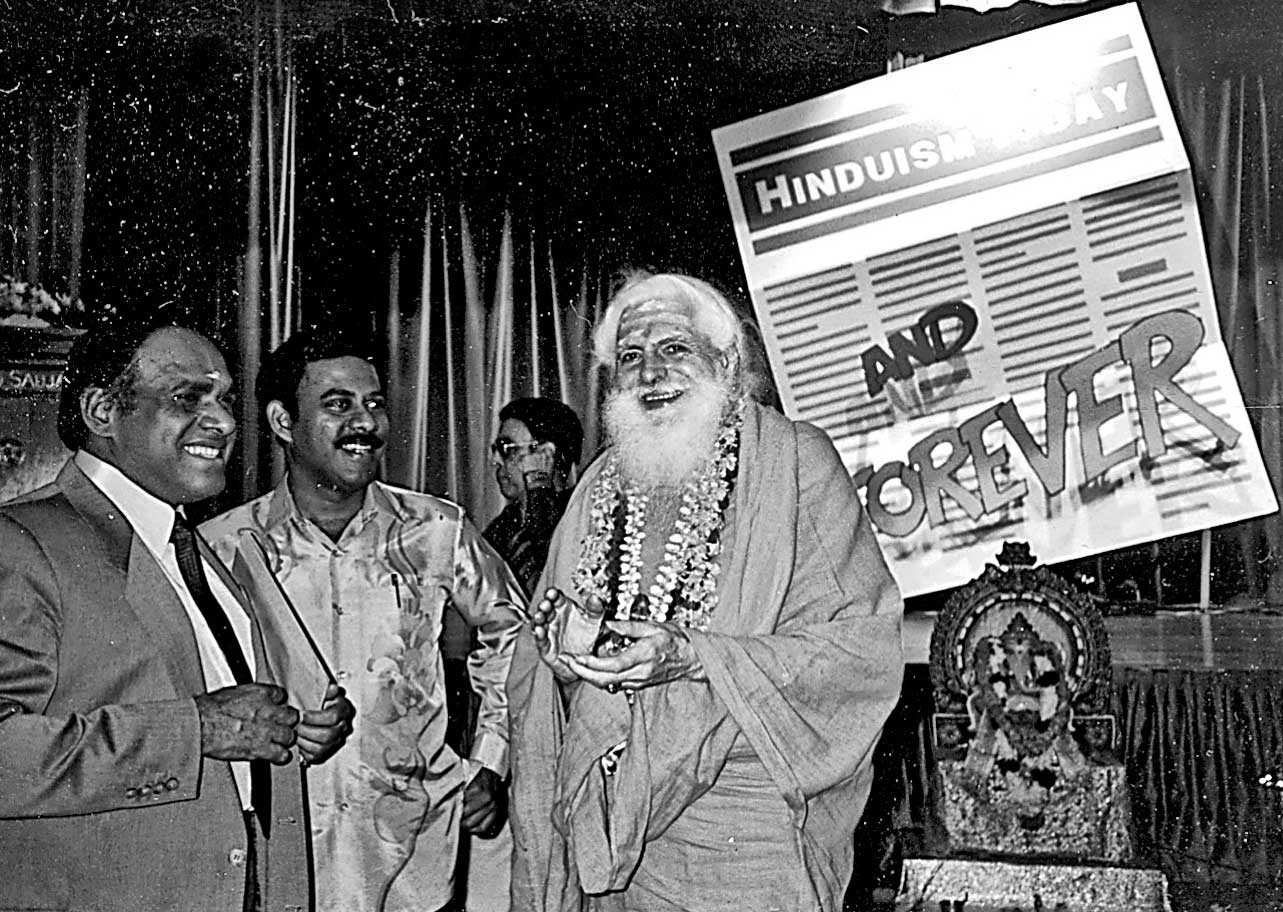
1991: The founder, Sivaya Subramuniyaswami, celebrating the magazine with followers in Malaysia.

Hinduism Today was launched in 1979 by Sivaya Subramuniyaswami (Gurudeva), published by his non-profit organization Himalayan Academy. The magazine was originally known as The New Saivite World, a small black-and-white periodical without a fixed publication schedule. The first issue appeared in February 1979, with the goal of giving a voice to Gurudeva's worldwide fellowship in a way that was easy to read, simple to produce, mail and handle. The newsletter was to be a people-oriented paper, not so much devoted to philosophy or teaching since the Himalayan Academy was publishing books on Hindu-related metaphysical topics as early as 1957.

In 1996, Sivaya Subramuniyaswami upgraded the newspaper Hinduism Today to a magazine. Recently, the magazine became available online with over 275,000 readers from North America, Europe, India, Singapore, Malaysia, Africa and Mauritius.

The magazine presents, through a Hindu perspective a wide range of topics pressing both to society and the individual. These topics include, but are not limited to, the following: education, culture, cosmology, philosophy, ethics, sociology, film, music, spirituality, food, and travel. In addition to regular writers, contributors include the magazine’s readers as well as the collective wisdom of major thinkers of both the eastern and western traditions, as captured in the magazine's regularly included quotations section. Informative articles also offer profound insights into modern life, with topics such as yoga, vegetarianism, meditation, nonviolence, environmental ethics and family life.

Specific goals of the magazine include:

1. To foster Hindu solidarity as a unity in diversity among all sects and lineages
2. To inform and inspire Hindus worldwide and people interested in Hinduism
3. To dispels myths, illusions and misinformation about Hinduism
4. To protect, preserve and promote the sacred Vedas and the Hindu religion
5. To nurture and monitor the ongoing spiritual Hindu renaissance;
6. To publish a resource for Hindu leaders and educators who promote Sanatana Dharma.

At the World Hindu Congress 2023 in Bangkok, Shri Milind Shrikant Parande (Secretary General of the Vishwa Hindu Parishad, Bharat) and Mohan Madhukar Bhagwat (Sarsanghchalak leader of the Rashtriya Swayamsevak Sangh) jointly presented an award for Hinduism Today to Bodhinatha Veylanswami. Shri Parande introduced the award:

"Hinduism Today’s commitment to nurturing Hindu solidarity, fostering unity and dispelling misconceptions about Hindu Dharma is truly praiseworthy. It has served as a guiding light of knowledge, inspiration and awakening for Hindus across the globe. The unwavering dedication to nurturing the ongoing spiritual Hindu renaissance and providing a valuable resource for Indian leaders and educators is immeasurable."
