= Bodhinatha Veylanswami =

American Hindu guru (Born:1942)

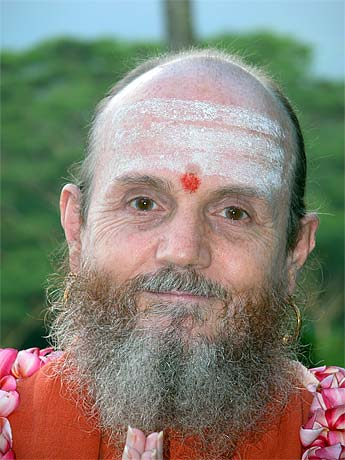
- Bodhinatha Veylanswami Hindu Saivite Guru Mahasannidhanam of the Kailasa Parampara of the Nandinatha Sampradaya

Personal life
- Born: 15 October 1942 Berkeley, California, United States

Religious life
- Religion: Hinduism
- Sect: Shaivism; Shaiva Siddhanta; Nath (Nandinatha Sampradaya)
- Initiation: March 1972; Alaveddy, Sri Lanka

Religious career
- Predecessor: Sivaya Subramuniyaswami
- Initiated: Sannyasa

Bodhinatha Veylanswami (born October 15, 1942 in Berkeley, California) is a Hindu sannyasi(monk) and a religious leader, who is the head of Kauai's Hindu Monastery and publisher of Hinduism Today magazine. He is the 163rd head of the self-claimed Nandinatha Sampradaya's Kailasa Parampara and Guru at Kauai's Hindu Monastery which is a 382-acre temple-monastery complex on Hawaii's Garden Island. He is known for his initiatives of digitizing the Saiva Agamas, scriptures of the Hindu Saivite religion and the basis for Hindu temple liturgy, making them freely available in digital format, encouraging their study and promoting reform Saivism which purges animal sacrifices mentioned in the Siddhantic scriptures thereby promoting Hindu vegetarianism. The Adi Saiva Sivachariyar priestly community honors him as "The Supreme Acharya who has uplifted and preserved the Agamas and the Agama tradition." Bodhinatha presides over three organizations: Saiva Siddhanta Church, Himalayan Academy publications and Hindu Heritage Endowment.

== Biography ==
Bodinatha was born in Berkeley, California on October 15, 1942. Bodhinatha began studying Vedanta and meditation in 1960, soon developing a deep interest in monastic life. In March 1972, he received sannyas diksha from Sivaya Subramuniyaswami in Alaveddy, Sri Lanka. He received the name Veylanswami a few weeks later at the Murugan Temple in Palani Hills.

In 1988, in preparation for initiation as an acharya in the Saiva Siddhanta Yoga Order, Bodhinatha spent six months on pilgrimage in India. Upon returning to Kauai, he was ordained as the first acharya of the religious order.

From 1993 Bodhinatha managed the formation and development of Hindu Heritage Endowment, a tax-exempt endowment that provides income to several Hindu initiatives and institutions across the world. There are over 80 individual funds within Hindu Heritage Endowment, which together exceed $10 million.

On October 21, 2001, Bodhinath was appointed as the successor of Sivaya Subramuniyaswami and officially became known as Satguru Bodhinatha Veylanswami.

== Spiritual lineage ==
Bodhinatha is the appointed successor of Satguru Sivaya Subramuniyaswami, an influential Hindu Saivite guru. Klaus Klostermaier, one of the world's leading specialists on Hindu studies, said in his A Survey of Hinduism: "Sivaya Subramuniyaswami ... did much to propagate a kind of reformed Saivism through his books." For example, Bodhinatha's reform Saivist Kauai Hindu Monastery stands firm on its reform that the animal sacrifices mentioned in the agamas must be purged from traditional Saivism, stopping short of veganism which necessitates abstinence from dairy, honey and other animal products used in Shaivism.

"As founder-editor of Hinduism Today, an illustrated monthly, he [Subramuniyaswami] became the single-most advocate of Hinduism outside India." He ordained Bodhinatha as leader of Saiva Siddhanta Church and 163rd Guru Mahasannidhanam of the Kailasa Parampara lineage, a position of authority in Saivism.

He follows the Shaivism sect (Shaiva Siddhanta) of Hinduism. He belongs to Nandinatha Sampradaya's Kailasa Parampara.

Spiritual lineage : Maharishi Nandinath → Sundaranandar, Siddhar who later becomes Tirumular → → → Kadaitswami → Chellapaswami → Siva Yogaswami → Sivaya Subramuniyaswami → Bodhinatha Veylanswami

Religious titles
Preceded by Satguru Sivaya Subramuniyaswami	163rd Satguru (Spiritual Preceptor); November 12, 2001 to present	Succeeded by (current preceptor)
Preceded by Satguru Sivaya Subramuniyaswami	Guru Mahasannidhanam, Kauai Aadheenam; November 12, 2001 to present	Succeeded by (current preceptor)

== Worldwide activities ==
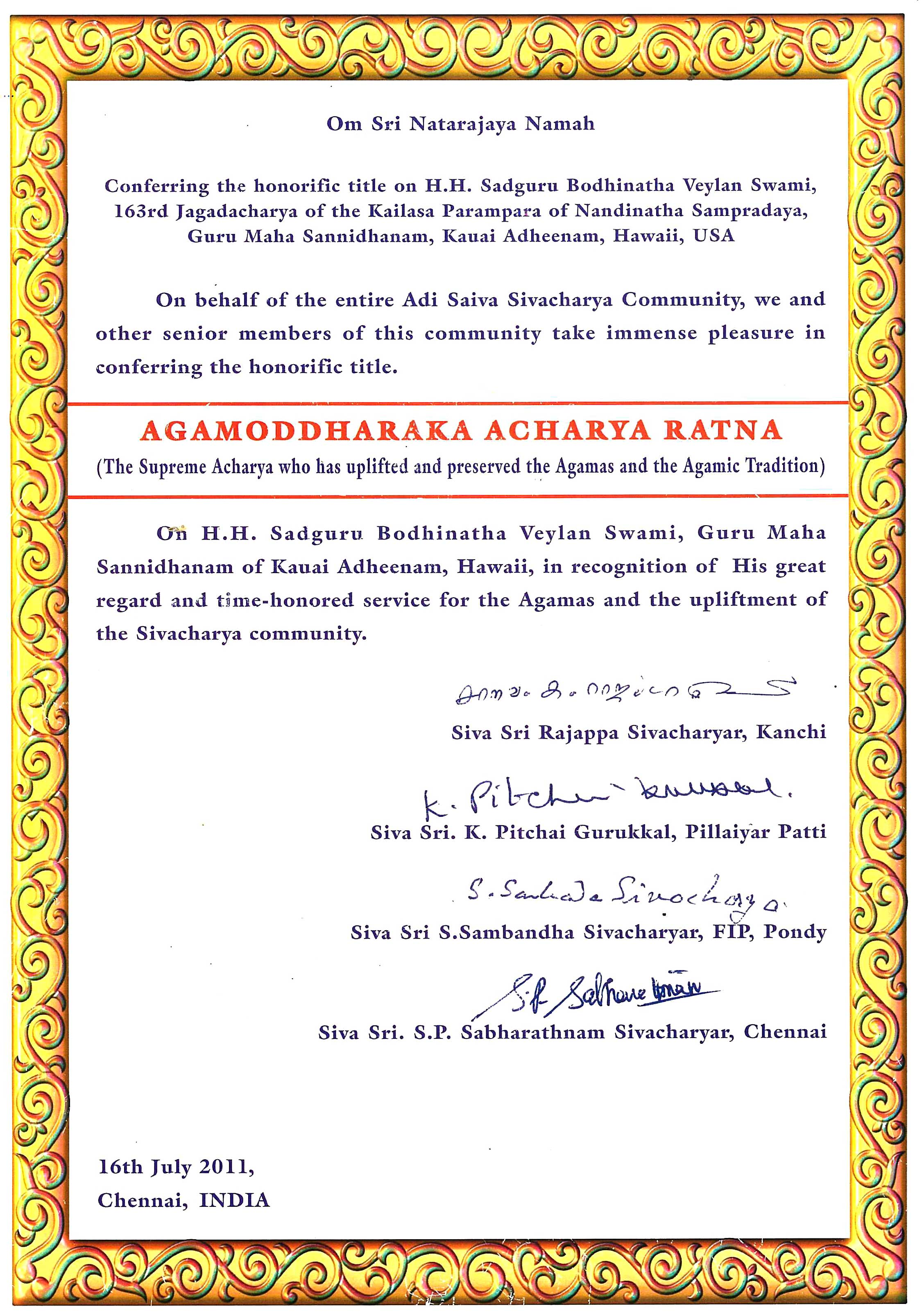
Honored as "Preserver of the Agamas"

Bodhinatha Veylanswami was a keynote speaker at Hindu Convocation of the Parliament of the World's Religions in Melbourne, Australia, an "assembly of a number of the most outstanding Hindu spiritual leaders of India." He mediated the seminal "Is Yoga Hindu?" session at the Parliament in December 2009, which sparked the Hindu American Foundation's "Take Back Yoga " campaign in 2010.

Bodhinatha is a popular speaker with Hindus, specially those of the Hindu diaspora living in the United States, Malaysia, Mauritius and Singapore. The "Indo-American News" wrote, "Bodhinatha is a formidable force in championing the cause of Hinduism. Soft-spoken yet imbued with immense knowledge and a keen wit, the satguru is a sought-after speaker the world over."

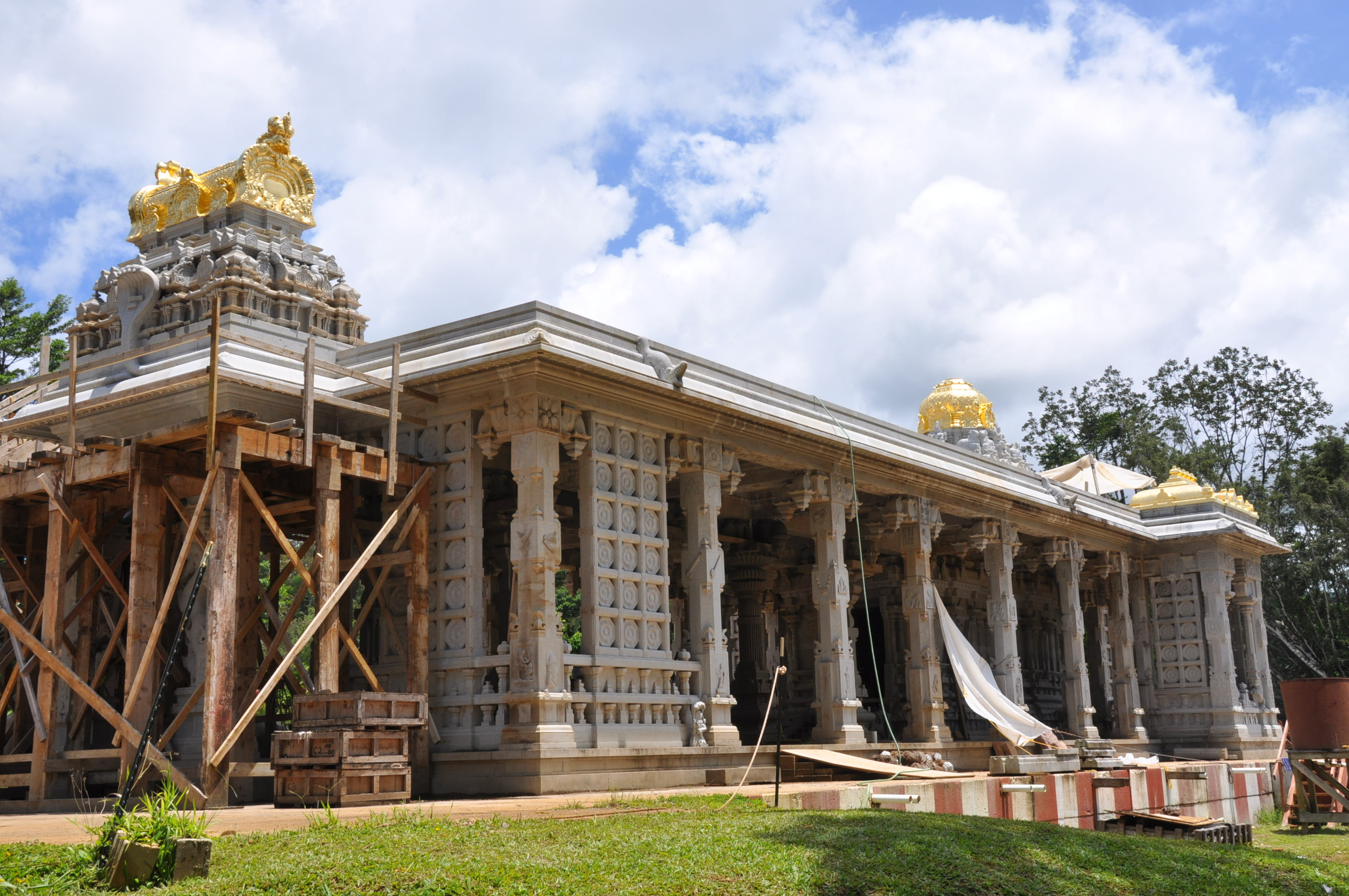
Iraivan Temple at Kauai's Hindu Monastery

Under Bodhinatha's guidance, his initiated Hindu swamis, yogis and sadhakas have been erecting Iraivan Temple, America's first all-granite, hand-carved Hindu Temple. He is an active partner in RSS's Hindutva unity initiatives.

== Images ==
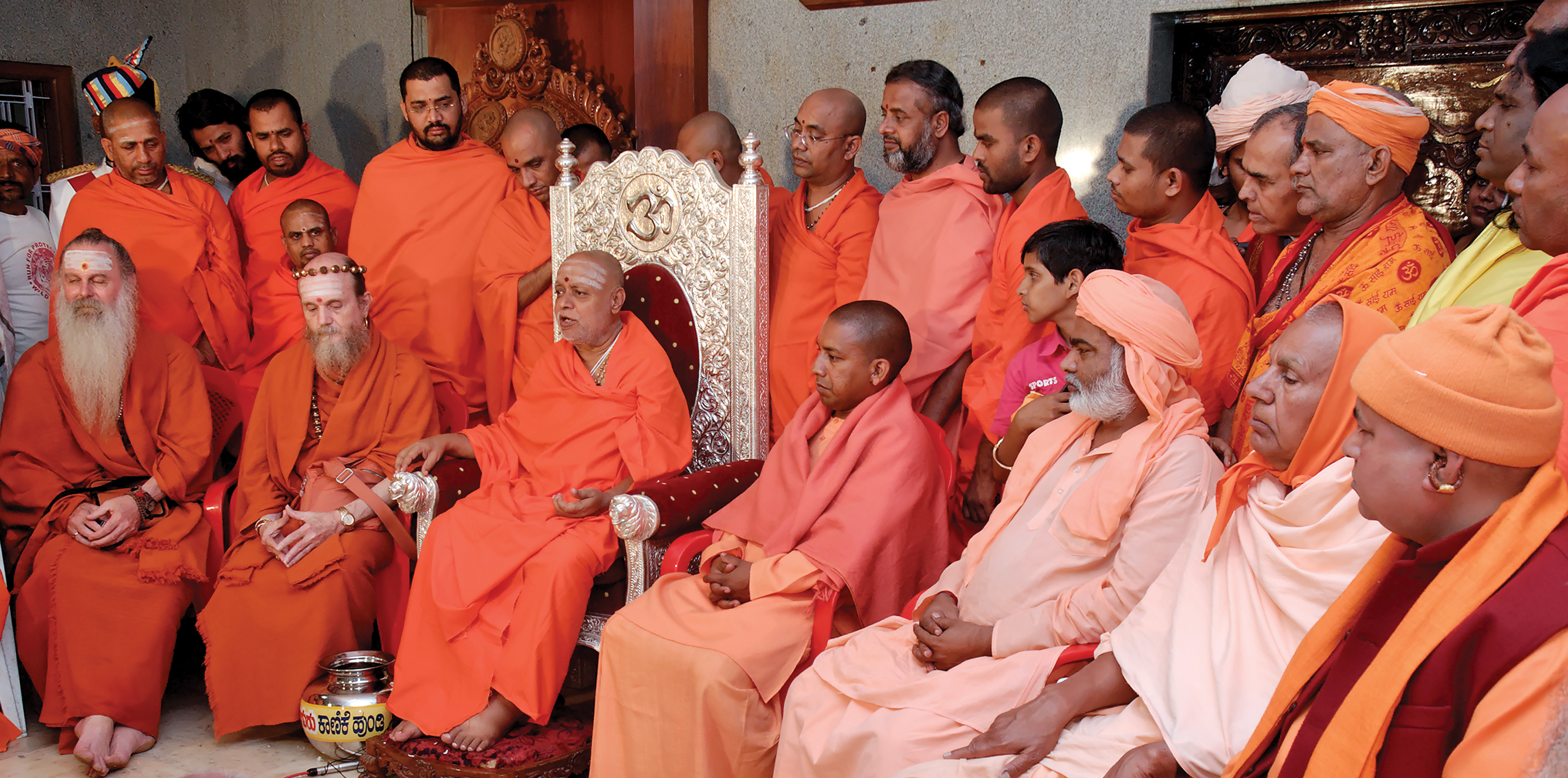
Bodhinatha attends a conference of Natha Sampradaya swamis hosted by Balagangadharanatha Swamiji. Includes Yogi Adityanath on center right.

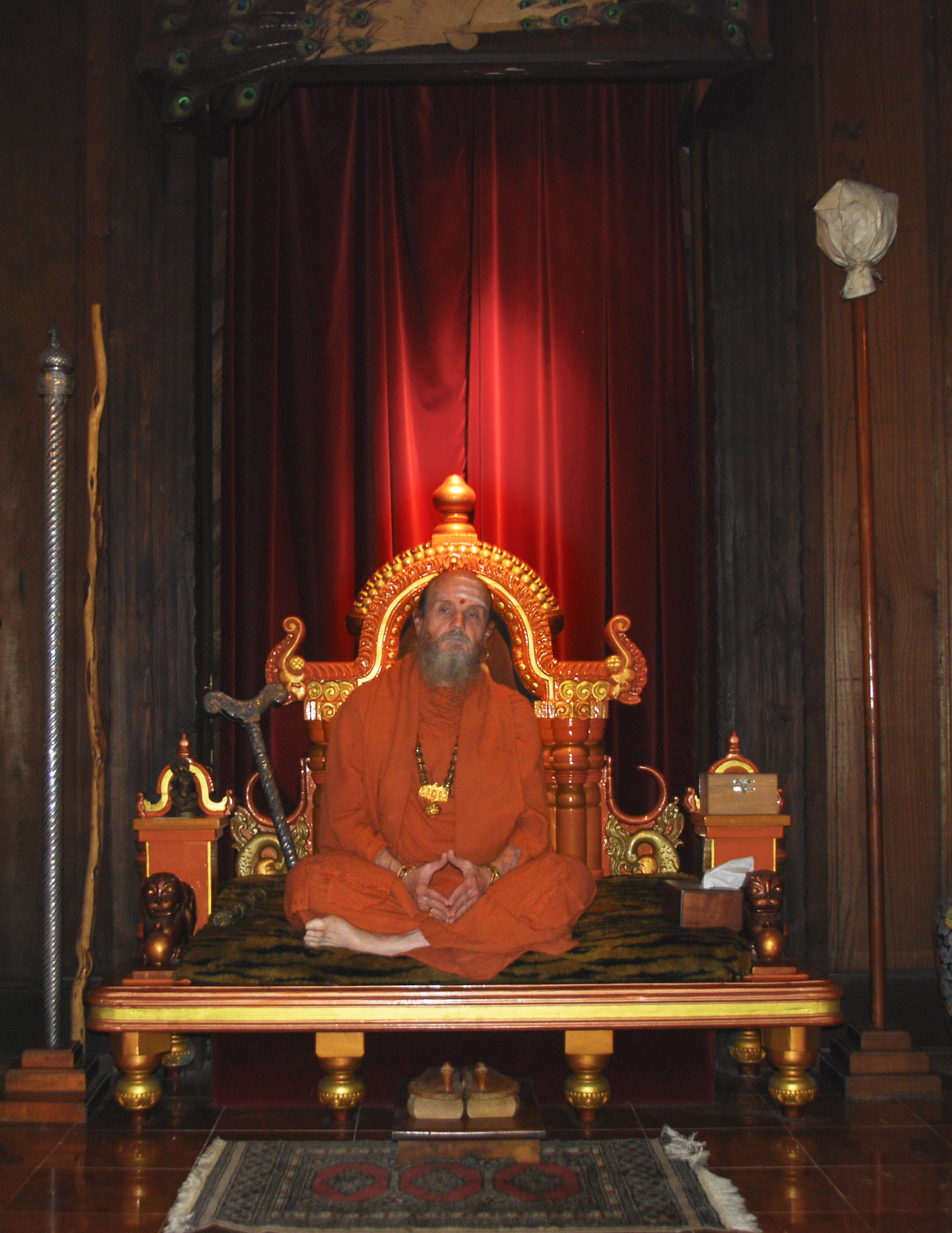
Bodhinatha on the Guru Peedham (the seat of authority) of Kauai Aadheenam

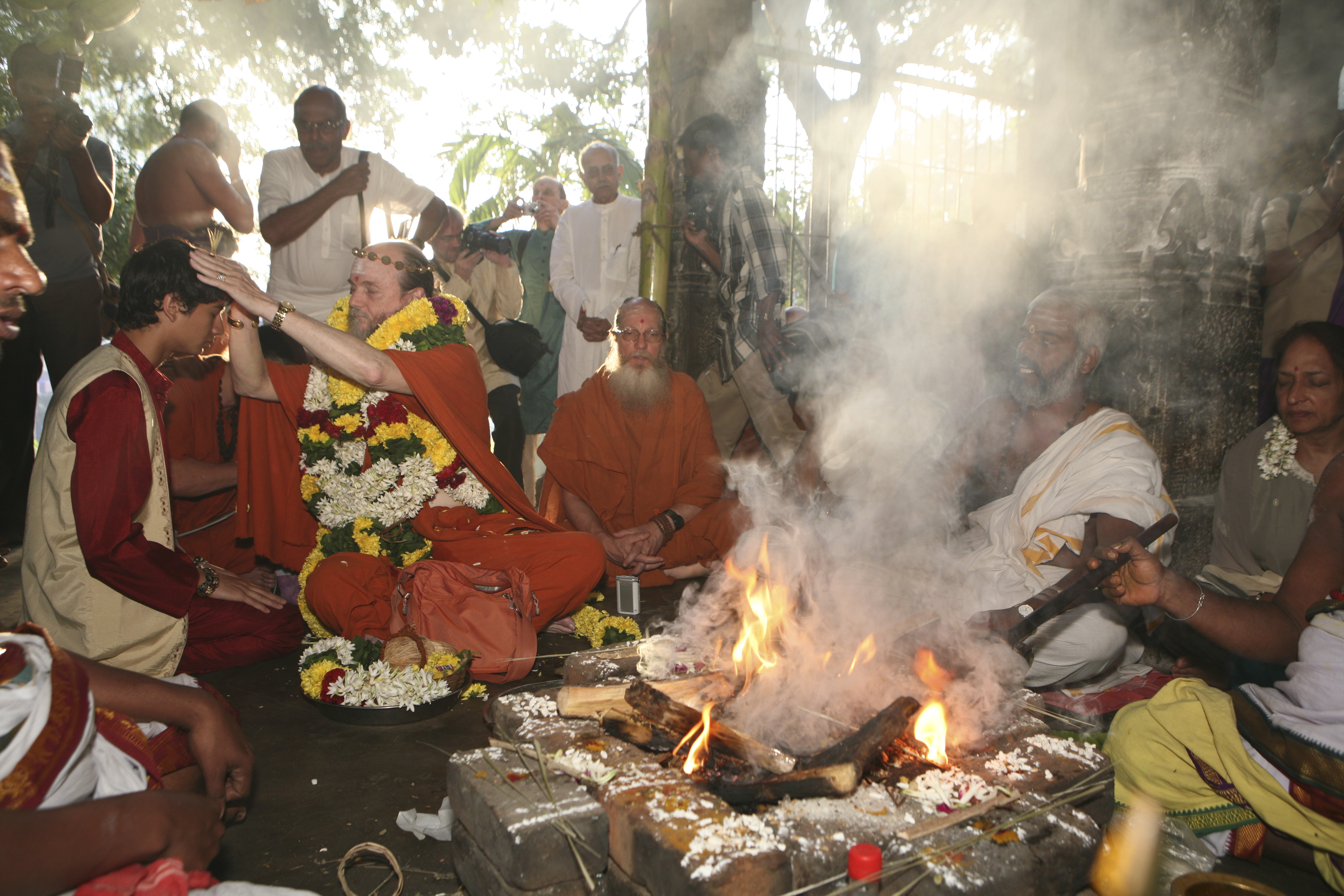
Satguru Bodhinatha Veylanswami gives samaya diksha, initiation into the sacred Aum Namah Shivaya mantra, to a devotee at Tirunnavamalai in 2008.
