= Freedom of religion in Sri Lanka =

Freedom of religion in Sri Lanka is a protected right under Chapter II, Article 9 of the constitution of Sri Lanka. This applies to all religions, though Buddhism is given the foremost place under the 1978 Republican Constitution. Sri Lanka is regarded by its Supreme Court as being a Buddhist state.

Limitations on proselytism were outlined by the Supreme Court of Sri Lanka in 2018, with the ruling against a Catholic organisation stating that the provision of economic and financial support to vulnerable individuals while promulgating a faith was an infringement upon those individuals' right to freedom of religion.

In 2023, the country was scored 2 out of 4 for religious freedom.

== Population ==
As of the 2012 census, 70.2% of Sri Lankans were Buddhists, 12.6% were Hindus, 9.7% were Muslims (mainly Sunni), 7.4% were Christians (mostly Catholics). Estimates in 2020 showed a small variation.

== Constitution ==
Article 9 of the constitution states: "The Republic of Sri Lanka shall give to Buddhism the foremost place and accordingly it shall be the duty of the State to protect and foster the Buddha Sasana while assuring to all religions the rights granted by Articles 10 and 14(1)(e)." The State Religion of Sri Lanka is Theravada Buddhism

Articles 10 and 14(1)(e) state: "Every person is entitled to freedom of thought, conscience and religion, including the freedom to have or to adopt a religion or belief of his choice." and "Every citizen is entitled to the freedom, either by himself or in association with others, and either in public or in private, to manifest his religion or belief in worship, observance, practice or teaching."

== Governance ==
Matters related to family law, eg, divorce, child custody, and property inheritance, full under either the customary law of the ethnic or religious group in question, or under the country’s civil law. In particular, Islamic personal law governs marriages and divorces of Muslims, while civil law applies to most property rights. Civil law governs most marriages of Sinhalese and Tamils of various religions, while personal law governs inheritance issues. Religious leaders report that practices vary by region, with numerous exceptions.

In 2014, the government established a special religious police unit to deal with religious complaints. The new unit reports to the Ministry of Law and Order, although it is housed in the Buddhist Division of the Ministry of Buddhist Sasana and Religious Affairs. Critics argued that it would bolster and strengthen the violent Buddhist nationalist groups such as Bodu Bala Sena (BBS).

Foreign clergy may work in the country, but for the last three decades, the government has limited the issuance of temporary work permits. Work permits for foreign clergy are issued for one year (rather than five years as in the past). It is possible to obtain extensions of work permits.

== Inter-religious relations ==
Hinduism is one of the earliest religions in Sri Lanka. The ancient tribes like Nagas and Yakshas were of Hindu origin. Buddhism was first spread by Mahinda which became the dominant religion in Sri Lanka. It's touted to be that the Sinhalese embraced Buddhism, and the Tamils remained Hindus.

When Sinhalese became the majority and have established their own kingdoms, the practice of Hinduism was allowed under Sinhalese kings since the Anuradhapura era (though Mahayana Buddhism was banned by king Parakramabahu). Buddhist Sinhalese kings gave protection to Muslims fleeing from Portuguese persecution and to Catholics fleeing from persecution by the Dutch after having been defeated by the Portuguese.

This coexistence has been marred by isolated incidents and attacks on religious places by Islamic extremist groups, Hindu extremist groups and a Buddhist extremist group. Several Hindu temples were attacked in the riots of 1983 in Colombo and South of Sri Lanka. While not acting on religious beliefs, the Sri Lankan air force air raided Hindu and Christian shrines during the Sri Lankan Civil War, with the belief that LTTE rebels had taken shelter there, with the Navaly church bombing being one notable controversial event. Two of the holiest sites for Buddhists in Sri Lanka, the Jaya Sri Maha Bodhi Tree and the Temple of the Tooth, were attacked and bombed by the secularist LTTE. The LTTE also attacked several Muslim mosques in the North-Eastern parts of the country.

During 2022, the National Christian Evangelical Alliance of Sri Lanka (NCEASL), noted that Christian groups reported that police were complicit in harassing religious minorities and their places of worship, often siding with the local majority religious community. In particular, police will often criticise pastors for holding worship services, rather than investigate threats made against them. In the same year, authorities allowed the breaking of a court order in order to construct a new Buddhist stupa in Kurunthoormalai (Note: According to the Mahavamsa (chapter 33) the Kurundi monastery was constructed by King Khallata Naga (109-103 BCE). It is known to be a site that was visited by Lord Buddha during his 2nd visit to Lanka. Among the 28 Sinhala Attakatha or commentaries, the Kurundi attakatha was written at this ancient Kurundi monastery. Source: https://www.kurundi.lk/about/) at the site of the ruins of the Athi Ayyanar Hindu Temple.

== See also ==
- Religion in Sri Lanka
- 2019 anti-Muslim riots in Sri Lanka
