= World Hindu Economic Forum =

Nonprofit organization based in Delhi, India

- Formation: 2010
- Type: Nonprofit organization
- Headquarters: Delhi, India
- Region served: Worldwide
- Official language: English
- Founder: Swami Vigyananand
- Website: www.wheforum.org

The World Hindu Economic Forum (WHEF) is a nonprofit based in Delhi, India. It describes itself as an independent international organization committed to the prosperity of Hindu society through the creation and sharing of surplus wealth. The forum brings together eminent Hindu intellectuals and businesses for the purposes of collaboration. The organization holds an annual international conference and several regional conferences in different parts of the world. Dr. Sriprakash Kothari was named as the chairperson of the second World Hindu Congress

== Introduction ==
The WHEF seeks to bring together financially successful individuals from the Hindu Society, such as traders, bankers, technocrats, investors, industrialists, businessmen, professionals, economists, and thinkers under one roof so that each group can share their business knowledge, experience, and expertise with their fellow brethren to make them understand the principles of surplus wealth generation to make society prosperous.

== History ==
The forum was founded by Shri Swami Vigyananand, an Alumnus of the Indian Institute of Technology Kharagpur. He says "We are now living in the 21st century, equipped with all the advanced technologies like airplane, internet, mobiles, and other modern facilities. When we go back in time to recollect the age of torture, destruction, suppression, and humiliation that our forefathers underwent, we should derive inspiration from the fact that when our ancestors worked and survived in such difficult times and conditions, so what stops us from excelling in these technologically advanced times?"

== International Events ==
=== New Delhi, Bharat 2014 ===
Third Annual conference of World Hindu Economic Forum was held in New Delhi with the theme "Thriving Economy, Prospering Economy". WHEF 2014 was one of the 7 parallel conferences of the first-ever World Hindu Congress being organized in New Delhi from 21–23 November 2014. Around 1800 delegates from 53 countries joined the 3-day event. As per newspapers, top government officials including ministers addressed the event showing full support for this event

Prominent speakers expected are the Dalai Lama, Swami Dayananda Saraswati, Dr. Mohanrao Bhagwat, Sarsanghchalak, Hon’ble Ministers: Shri Nitin Gadkari, Minister of Road Transport and Highways, Smt. Smriti Irani, Minister of Human Resources Development, Smt. Nirmala Sitharaman, Minister of State for Commerce and Industry, Dr. Ashni Singh, Minister of Finance, Republic of Guyana; Eminent Scientists: G.Madhavan Nair, Dr. Vijay Bhatkar, leading educationists: Prof. S.B. Majumdar, Dr. G. Visvanthan, Prof. Kapil Kapoor, filmmakers Priyadarshan and Major Ravi, Popular film actress from South Smt. Sukanya Ramesh also joined and spoke at the event.

=== Bangkok 2013 ===
The conference was inaugurated by Shri D. Devadas, Member Organising Committee WHEF Bangkok, 2013; Shri Susheel Saraff, Chairman, Organising Committee WHEF 2013, Bangkok; Shri Arun Kumar Bajaj, Convener, WHEF Steering Committee; Dr. Gautam Sen, Member, WHEF Steering Committee, Retired Lecturer of London School of Economics & Political Science; H. E. Shri Anil Wadhwa, Ambassador of Bharat of Thailand; H. E. Dr. Olarn Chaipravat, President of the Thailand Trade Representative & Former Deputy Prime Minister of Thailand. H. E. Dr. Olarn Chaipravat welcomed all the delegates on behalf of the Prime Minister of Thailand and the Royal Thai Government. 7 different sessions were conducted. The sessions included discussions on topics like Emerging opportunities & challenges from free trade agreements, regional economic communities & new geographical areas, Keynote Speeches from Businesses and industries, Enormous opportunities of business in alternative energy, and so on. The sessions were chaired by genius minds like Prof. (Dr.) R. Vaidyanathan, Shri Suresh Prabhu, Prof. (Dr.) Guna Magesan. One session was chaired by young and vibrant Kritika Bajaj. This underlined the greater involvement of youth in WHEF and many of its activities. Another such session was conducted by Liza Bhansali, Pritika Sharma & Nitika Sharma which focused on entrepreneurship among today's youth. Amit Srivastava presented the report at the World Hindu and Student Conference organized in Bali in 2012. Shri S.V. Anand handed over the first copy of the book 'Global Handbook on Flooring' to Shri L. Gopakumar and Shri Vinod Kumar to mark the book's release. The conference united most of the influential personalities in the field of economy and business and led to a lot of knowledge exchange. This catalyzed the efforts to strengthen the economy.

=== Hong Kong 2012 ===
The World Hindu Economic Forum for South East Asia was conducted in Hong Kong, in the year 2012. The conference was divided in four panels: Making small & medium-sized enterprise successful in Global Marketplace, Developing Hindu Economy, Mega trends in global economy and Prospects of Bharat's economy and Mantra for Successful Business Enterprise, were designed to discuss nuances of economy & business.

== Regional Events ==
- Europe – 2012: Took place at the London Chamber of Commerce and Industry on 4 November 2012. It was conducted at the heart of the European Business Center.
- South-East and East Asia – 2013: Organized in Malaysia from 6–7 January 2013 at the Berjaya Times Square Hotel.
- North America – 2013: Took place on 28 April 2013 in Dallas, Texas. It was the first forum of its kind in North America where Hindu entrepreneurs from across various business domains came together on one platform. Many prominent Hindu businessmen and venture capitalists from Texas and other parts of The USA were at the forum.
- Pacific – 2013: Organized in Fiji on 4 May 2013 at The Sheraton Hotel Nadi, with the theme "Making the South Pacific Community Prosperous". Workshops' themes included "young Hindu business leaders" and "developing entrepreneurship among women".
- South Africa – 2014: Hosted by the Lotus Chamber of Commerce, the theme of the conference was "Making Africa Prosperous".
