= Chellapaswami =

Satguru Chellapaswami (Tamil: செல்லப்பாசுவாமி, 1840–1915) was a 20th-century Sri Lankan Shaiva Hindu Sage. He was the guru of Satguru Yogaswami and was the 160th Jagadacharya of the self claimed Nandinatha Sampradaya's Kailasa Parampara. He lived in the Jaffna peninsula near Nallur Kandaswamy temple. His guru was Kadaitswami.

== Spiritual lineage ==
He followed the Shaivism sect (Shaiva Siddhanta) of Hinduism. He belongs to Nandinatha Sampradaya's Kailasa Parampara. Saiva siddhanta is prevalent in South India, Sri Lanka and Malaysia.

Spiritual lineage : Maharishi Nandinath → Sundaranandar, a Siddhar who later becomes Tirumular → → → Kadaitswami → Chellapaswami → Siva Yogaswami → Sivaya Subramuniyaswami → Bodhinatha Veylanswami

Religious titles
| Preceded by Satguru Kadaitswami | 160th Satguru (Spiritual Preceptor) | Succeeded by Satguru Siva Yogaswami |
