= World Hindu Congress =

- Formation: 2014
- Type: International organization
- Headquarters: Delhi, India
- Region served: Worldwide
- Leader: Swami Vigyananand
- Website: worldhinducongress.org

The World Hindu Congress (WHC) is a global forum for Hindus to connect, share ideas, inspire one another, and impact the common good.

== Background ==
It is organized by the World Hindu Foundation (WHF), an international Hindu organization. The WHC is organized around a central theme that encapsulates the essence of Hindu Dharma and its relevance in today's world. Past themes have included "Sangachchhadhwam Samvadadhwam (Step together, Express together)", "Think Collectively, Achieve Valiantly," and "Dharma, the Abode of Victory." The most recent 3rd summit was held in Bangkok, Thailand, from 24–26 November 2023.

== See also ==
- World Hindu Economic Forum
