= Nandinatha Sampradaya =

Shaivite sect of Hinduism

Nandinatha Sampradaya (Sanskrit : नन्दिनाथ सम्प्रदाय) is a denomination of Shaivism sect of Hinduism that places great importance on the practice of yoga. It is related to the broader Nath Sampradaya. The self-styled living preceptor and 163rd head of the Nandinatha Sampradaya's Kailasa Parampara is Bodhinatha Veylanswami. It is most popular among diasporic Hindu communities (peculiarly Tamil Hindus) of North America and beyond, as well among the Sri Lankan Tamils.

== Origins and lineage ==
According to no other source than Sivaya Subramuniyaswami, this is the history of the Sampradaya and its founder.

The Nandinatha Sampradaya traces its beginning to at least 200 BCE. Its founder and first known spiritual preceptor was Maharishi Nandinatha. Nandinatha is said to have initiated eight disciples, Sanatkumar, Sanakar, Sanadanar, Sananthanar, Shivayogamuni, Patanjali, Vyaghrapada, and Sundaranandar, a Siddhar who later becomes Tirumular by a chance happening, and sent them to various places to spread the teachings of Shaiva Siddhanta. Though some of these disciples were sent as far as China to spread the Shaiva Siddhanta philosophy of their Guru, the work of two is especially important.

Patanjali is remembered as the author of the Yoga Sutras. This crucial text is one of the most widely quoted and respected texts on the practice of Yoga. Its translations are studied today in Yoga Centers throughout the world. Most of the mystical, Sanskrit vocabulary of Yoga teachings are first codified in this text. The Ashtanga Yoga (eight-limbed) process of Yoga comes from this text. The text contains a spiritual blueprint for using the physical body to yoke consciousness to the Divine source.

Tirumular authored the Tirumantiram, which is a well known Tamil text. The Tirumantiram is still chanted in Tamil Nadu. It covers a wide variety of topics and illuminates much of the esoteric mystical insight of this Sampradaya. It illustrates the life style and moral conduct advocated by this tradition. It provides much insight into the mystical meditations and tantras (techniques) valued by the Nandinatha Sampradaya. It places great emphasis on repetition of the panchakshara (or five lettered) mantra: Om Namah Shivaya

Spiritual lineage : Maharishi Nandinath → Sundaranandar, Siddhar who later becomes Tirumular → → → Kadaitswami → Chellappaswami → Siva Yogaswami → Sivaya Subramuniyaswami → Bodhinatha Veylanswami

Its historically established origins revolve around the figure of Kadaitswami, a sadhu of North Indian origin, who initiated the said Nandinatha Sampradaya in northern Ceylon at the end of the 19th century. His disciples and successors, Chellapaswami and later Yogaswami, continued and deepened the tradition in the Jaffna region, which was then undergoing a major phase of religious ascendancy and affirmation known as the Hindu Revivalism, especially Shaivism. Sivaya Subramuniyaswami, the third successor in this spiritual lineage, founded the Saiva Siddhanta Church, which spread from Sri Lanka (Alaveddy, Jaffna) to the United States (San Francisco, California, then Kauaʻi, Hawaii) between the 1940s and 1970s.

== Beliefs ==
The teachings of the Nandinatha Sampradaya, value highly the necessity of a living preceptor to carry the unseen, energetic essence of these teaching to devotees. The Nandinatha Sampradaya is a Siddha Yoga Tradition ("Siddha" means literally attainment), and its Gurus have often demonstrated great mystical abilities and wisdom. It is said that these teachers have realized their oneness with the Supreme God (they call "Shiva") and have merged as completely as humanly possible with this Divine source of all. With such realization, it is said, comes limitless bliss and direct command of every power in the universe. There are many accounts of miraculous powers demonstrated by the Teachers of this lineage. It is taught that the aid of such a highly realized Siddha can greatly quicken spiritual practice. Some even say that without the diksha (initiation) of such teachers, the human instincts will always fail to lead to this highest Realization.

The Nandinatha Sampradaya is maintained today by several groups stemming from MahaRishi Nandinatha's eight disciples. The Kailasa Parampara is based out of Kauaʻi, Hawaii, U.S.A. where a monastery and mandir (temple) is maintained. The Sannyasis (Monks) of this order continue to spread the teachings of this Sampradaya through the Himalayan Academy and the "Hinduism Today" magazine. Satguru Bodhinatha Veylanswami is the living preceptor or the 163rd Guru Mahasannidhanam of the Kailasa Parampara of the Nandinatha Sampradaya.

== See also ==
- Nath Sampradaya
- Parampara
- Sampradaya
