= Sivaya Subramuniyaswami =

American Hindu religious leader (1927–2001)

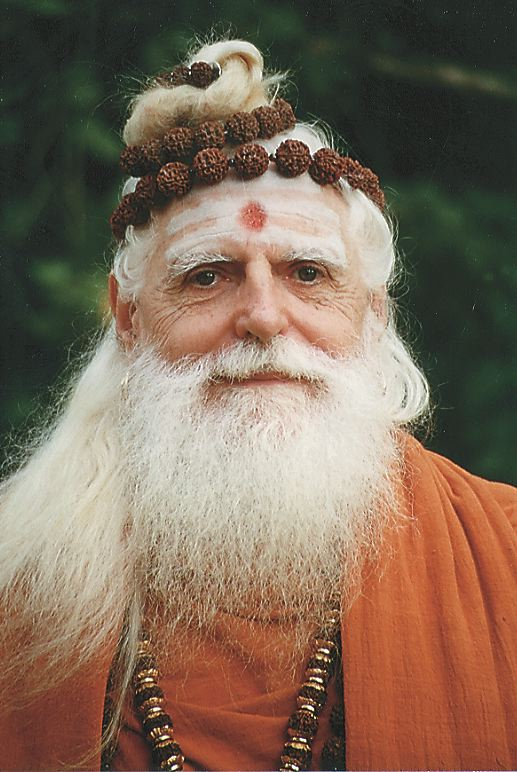
- Sivaya Subramuniyaswami

Personal life
- Born: Robert Hansen; 5 January 1927 Oakland, California, U.S.
- Died: 12 November 2001 (aged 74) Kapaa, Hawaii, U.S.

Religious life
- Religion: Hinduism
- Sect: Shaivism; Shaiva Siddhanta; Nath (Nandinatha Sampradaya)
- Initiation: 1949; Jaffna, Ceylon by Jnanaguru Yogaswami

Religious career
- Teacher: Jnanaguru Yogaswami
- Predecessor: Jnanaguru Yogaswami
- Successor: Bodhinatha Veylanswami
- Initiated: Sannyasa

Sivaya Subramuniyaswami (born Robert Hansen; January 5, 1927 – November 12, 2001) was an American Hindu religious leader known as Gurudeva by his followers. Subramuniyaswami was born in Oakland, California and adopted Hinduism as a young man. He was the 162nd head of the self-claimed Nandinatha Sampradaya's Kailasa Parampara and Guru at Kauai's Hindu Monastery which is a 382-acre (155 ha) temple-monastery complex on Hawaii's Garden Island.

In 1947, at the age of 20, he journeyed to India and Sri Lanka and in 1949, was initiated into sannyasa by the renowned siddha yogi and worshiper of Shiva, Jnanaguru Yogaswami of Jaffna, Sri Lanka who was regarded as one of the 20th century's remarkable mystics. In the 1970s he established a Hindu monastery in Kauai, Hawaii and founded the magazine Hinduism Today. In 1985, he created the festival of Pancha Ganapati as a Hindu alternative to December holidays like Christmas. He was one of Shaivism's Gurus, the founder and leader of the Shaiva Siddhanta Church.

He is part of the guru lineage of the Sri Lankan Alaveddy Hindus. His various institutions form a Jaffna-Tamil-based organization which has branched out from his Sri Subramuniya Ashram in Alaveddy to meet the needs of the growing Hindu diaspora of this century. He also established a seven-acre (2.8 ha) monastery in Mauritius, which includes a public Spiritual Park called "Spiritual Park- Pointe de Lascars". He oversaw more than 50 independent temples worldwide.

His influence reflected the reach of his publications, including the approximately 30 books he wrote. Subramuniyaswami was described by Klaus Klostermaier as "the single-most advocate of Hinduism outside India". The book Religious Leaders of America explained Subramuniyaswami's role as "a pillar of orthodox Hinduism."

== Biography ==
=== Youth in California (1927–1946) ===
Sivaya Subramuniyaswami was born in Oakland, California on January 5, 1927 as Robert Hansen. He is quoted as relating how, at the age of six, "the totality of the power of the eternity of the moment began to become stronger and stronger within me from that time onward." He was most inspired by the life of Swami Vivekananda and his four small volumes: Raja Yoga, Bhakti Yoga, Karma Yoga and Inspired Talks, and most particularly by Swami Vivekananda's poem, "The Song of the Sannyasin."

Sivaya Subramuniyaswami's training in classical Eastern and Western dance and in the disciplines of yoga developed him into a dancer. He joined the San Francisco Ballet Company, becoming their danseur by the age of nineteen. At twenty years of age, he took the first ship to leave for India after World War II. He celebrated his twenty-first birthday just days before going ashore and walking through the grand Gateway to India in Mumbai.

=== Visit to Sri Lanka (1947–1949) ===
Sivaya Subramuniyaswami spent almost three years on the island of Ceylon, now called Sri Lanka. Before meeting his guru, he studied with his fourth "catalyst" for a year and a half. Sivaya Subramuniyaswami just wanted to meditate, but his teacher made him work to help village people with reconstructing rural areas. Sivaya Subramuniyaswami visited and lived in many Buddhist temples in Sri Lanka. He was received by the monks there and saw how they lived and dressed. This experience influenced in a very strict way the monastic protocols that he later put into action in his own monastic order.

In the caves of Jalani, Kurugala Balandha, Sri Lanka, he fasted and meditated until he experienced what he felt to be enlightenment. Sivaya Subramuniyaswami relates his feelings while returning to Colombo, Sri Lanka: "Returning back to the city, nothing looked the same anymore. I was in another dimension. Everything was different. I had lost something: the desire for the realization of the Self. I felt complete. I felt alone."

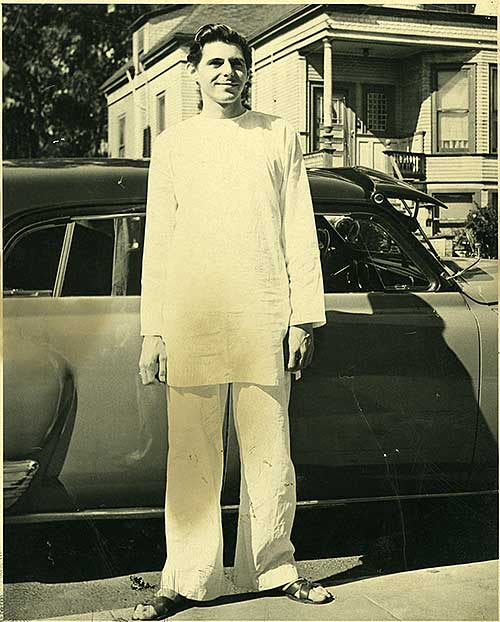
Sivaya Subramuniyaswami in 1949, right after his return from Sri Lanka

Back in Colombo, Sivaya Subramuniyaswami met his final teacher before meeting his guru. One day, his teacher arranged a meeting between Sivaya Subramuniyaswami and his long-awaited satguru, Sage Yogaswami. After a deep and inner meeting, Yogaswami gave him the name Subramuniya, an epithet of Kartikeya. Subra means 'the light that emanates out from the central source'; muni means a silent teacher, and ya means 'restraint'. Subramuniya means a self-restrained soul who remains silent or speaks out from intuition. After a few visits, Jnanaguru Yogaswami initiated Subramuniya into sannyasa and ordained him into his lineage with a slap on the back giving the following instructions: "This sound will be heard in America! Now go 'round the world and roar like a lion. You will build palaces (temples) and feed thousands." This event was witnesses by several Jaffna area devotees, notably a local magistrate named S. Subramaniam.

Yogaswami continued to communicate with Sivaya Subramuniyaswami through Kandiah Chettiar until his death in 1964. In the line of successorship, Subramuniya was considered the 162nd Jagadacharya of the Nandinatha Sampradaya's Kailasa Parampara.

=== San Francisco (1949–1970) ===
In late 1949, Subramuniya sailed back to America and embarked on seven years of ardent, solitary yoga and meditation In 1956, Sivaya Subramuniyaswami said, he had a tremendous spiritual experience in Denver, Colorado, where "the soul body would finally fully inhabit the physical body". The following year, in San Francisco, Subramuniya founded what is now Himalayan Academy and opened America's first Hindu temple at 3575 Sacramento Street, near Presidio Park. In Switzerland, 1968, he wrote of Shum, a mystical language of meditation that names and maps inner areas of consciousness.

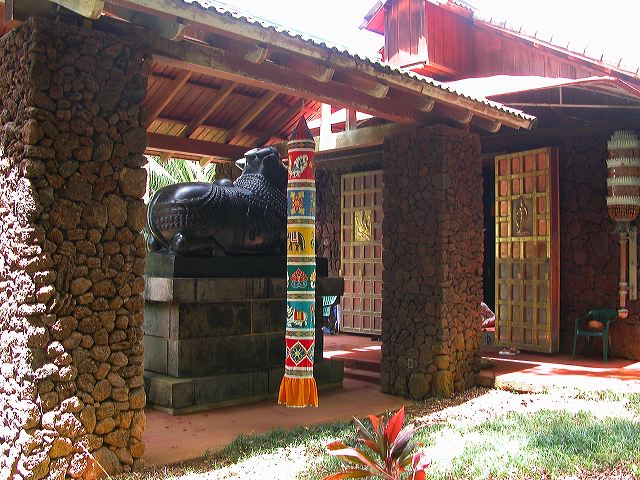
Kadavul Temple at Kauai's Hindu Monastery

=== Subramuniya in the 1950s and 1960s ===
The biographies of Subramuniya show a time of transition between 1950 and 1957. Subramuniya states that he was ordered not to teach until he turned thirty in January 1957. He spent some of these seven years traveling around the United States, teaching hatha yoga classes and exploring various non-traditional religions, such as Christian Science, Theosophy, and the science of the mind, the closest Western religions to Hindu thought. His shift to a teaching ministry as Master Subramuniya in 1957 blends elements of these religious movements with Hindu yogic and Vedanta teachings in a language oriented toward his followers at the time, who were Westerners. Subramuniya in the 1950s and 1960s might be placed in an American metaphysical lineage that can be traced from 19th century Theosophy to the New Age Movement in the late 1970s.

Accordingly, Subramuniya's early publications, The Self-God (1959), Cognizantibility (1958), Gems of Cognition (1958) and Clear White Light (1968) do not mention Shaiva Siddhanta, Hinduism, Shiva, his guru or lineage or his avocation of temple worship so prominently found in his later works. All of Subramuniya's early works stress meditation, an advaita based monism and yoga.

Subramuniya also experimented with combining aspects of Hinduism with Christianity in another context. He opened two centers in San Francisco in 1957: one Hindu, the Subramuniya Yoga Order, and the other a Hindu/Christian hybrid, the Christian Yoga Church. A typical Sunday worship at the Christian Yoga Church included the singing of Christian hymns, readings from the New Testament and the Bhagavad Gita or Upanishads and a sermon related to Christian or Hindu mysticism. In this context, Master Subramuniya was known as Father Subramuniya.

=== Kauai (1970–2001) ===
Sivaya Subramuniyaswami moved his ashram to Kauai in 1970, establishing Kauai Aadheenam, on a riverbank near the foot of an extinct volcano. Also known as Kauai's Hindu Monastery, Kauai Aadheenam is a 382-acre (155 ha) temple-monastery complex on Hawaii's Garden Island. In 1979 he published the Holy Orders of Sannyas, defining the ideals, vows and aspirations of Hindu monasticism. In 1979 he founded the Hinduism Today magazine, and in the early 80s, after his world tours, focused his magazine on uniting all Hindus, regardless of nationality or sect, and inspiring and educating seekers everywhere. In Sri Lanka, Sivaya Subramuniyaswami formally took possession of the main building of his Sri Subramuniya Ashram in Alaveddy, founded in 1949.

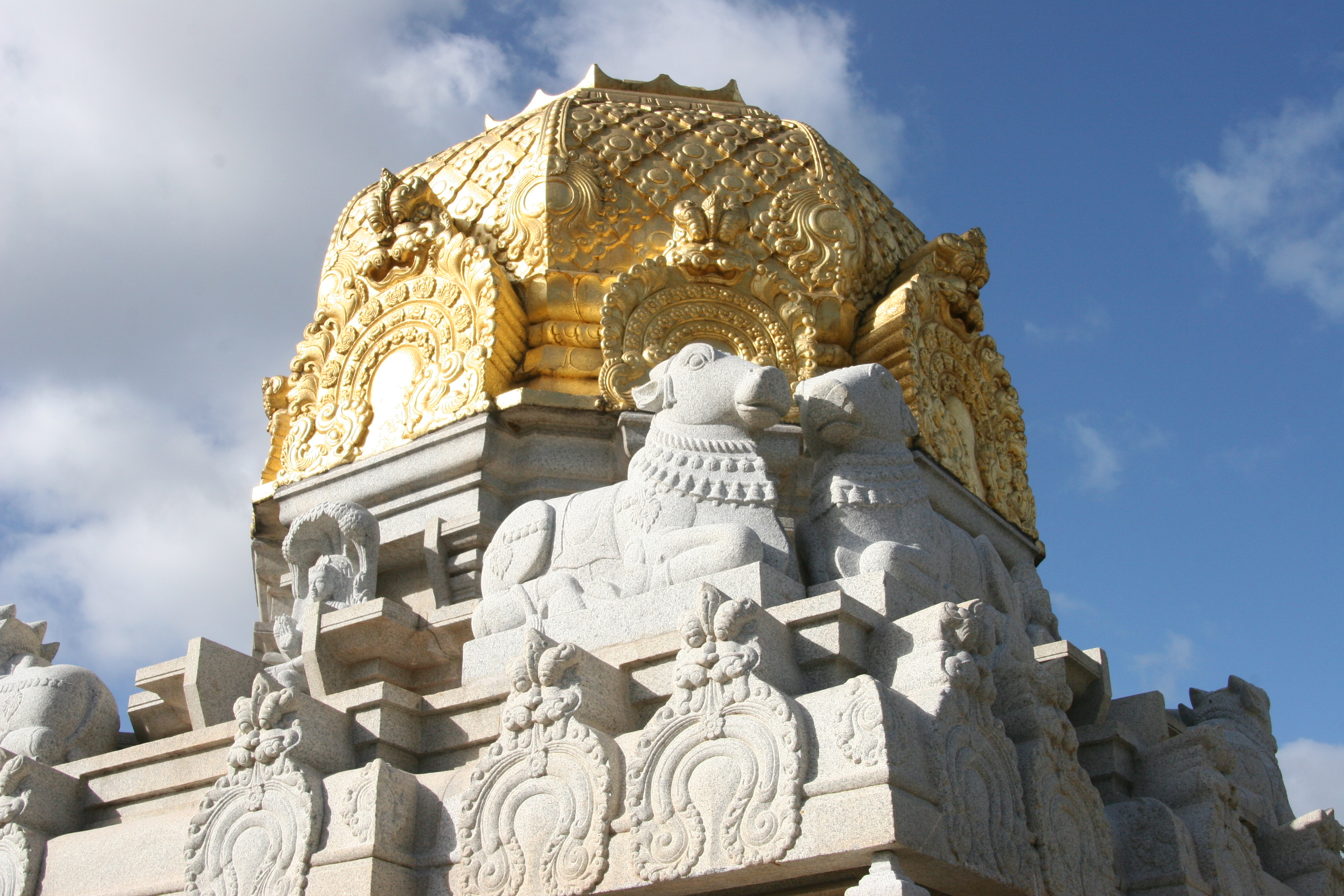
Capstone of Iraivan Temple at Kauai's Hindu Monastery

In 1986, Sivaya Subramuniyaswami founded a branch monastery in Mauritius in response to the government's request that he come there "to revive a languishing Hindu faith." In 1991 he produced the Nandinatha Sutras, 365 aphorisms that outlines the path of virtuous Hindu living. Especially in the early 1990s he campaigned for fair treatment of temple priests, particularly that they should receive the same respect enjoyed by the clergy of other religions. In 2000, he translated the first two books of the Kural into English and also published How to Become a Hindu, showing the way for seekers to formally enter the faith, confuting the notion that "You must be born a Hindu to be a Hindu." In November of that year, he launched Hindu Press International (HPI), a free daily news summary for breaking news sent via e-mail and posted on the web. In 2001, he completed the 3,000-page Master Course trilogy of Dancing with Siva, Living with Siva, and Merging with Siva – volumes of daily lessons on Hindu philosophy, culture and yoga, respectively.

=== Death ===
Learning on October 9, 2001, that he had advanced, metastasized intestinal cancer, confirmed by a host of specialists in three states, all concurring that even the most aggressive treatment regimens would not prove effective, he declined any treatment beyond palliative measures and decided to follow the Indian yogic practice, known as Prayopavesa in Sanskrit scripture, to abstain from nourishment and take water only from that day on. He died on the 32nd day of his self-declared fast at 11:54 pm on November 12, 2001, surrounded by his twenty-three monastics.

== Spiritual lineage ==
He followed the Shaivism sect (Shaiva Siddhanta) of Hinduism, and according to him, belonged to Nandinatha Sampradaya's Kailasa Parampara. Shaiva Siddhanta is prevalent in South India, Sri Lanka and Malaysia.

Spiritual lineage : Maharishi Nandinath → Sundaranandar, Siddhar who later becomes Tirumular → → → Kadaitswami → Chellapaswami → Siva Yogaswami → Sivaya Subramuniyaswami → Bodhinatha Veylanswami

Religious titles
Preceded by Satguru Siva Yogaswami of Jaffna, Sri Lanka	162nd Satguru (Spiritual Preceptor); 1959 – November 12, 2001	Succeeded by Satguru Bodhinatha Veylanswami
Preceded by Satguru Siva Yogaswami of Jaffna, Sri Lanka	Guru Mahasannidhanam, Kauai Aadheenam; 1970 – November 12, 2001	Succeeded by Satguru Bodhinatha Veylanswami

== Honors and awards ==
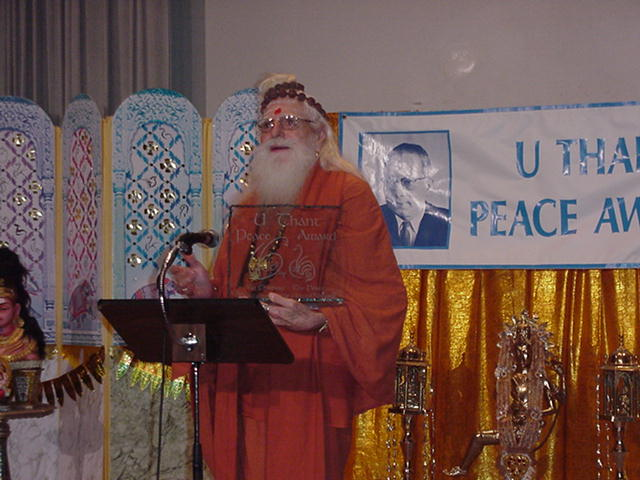
2000: Sivaya Subramuniyaswami receiving the U Thant Peace Award at the United Nations in New York

- 1986 - New Delhi's Parliament of the World's Religions named Sivaya Subramuniyaswami one of five modern-day Jagadacharyas, means world teachers, for his international efforts in promoting Hinduism.
- 1988 - Oxford, England: Hindu representative at the Global Forum of Spiritual and Parliamentary Leaders for Human Survival. Sivaya Subramuniyaswami joined hundreds of religious, political and scientific leaders from all countries to discuss privately, for the first time, the future of human life on this planet.
- 1988 - Oxford : he represented Hinduism at the Global Forum of Spiritual and Parliamentary Leaders .
- 1990 - Moscow : he again represented Hinduism at the Global Forum of Spiritual and Parliamentary Leaders
- 1992 - Rio de Janeiro : he again represented Hinduism at the Global Forum of Spiritual and Parliamentary Leaders
- 1993 - Chicago: at the centenary Parliament of the World's Religions, Sivaya Subramuniyaswami was elected one of three presidents, along with Swami Chidananda Saraswati of the Rishikesh-based Divine Life Society and Kerala's Mata Amritanandamayi, to represent Hinduism at the Presidents' Assembly, a core group of 25 men and women voicing the needs of world faiths.
- 1995 - New Delhi's Parliament of the World's Religions bestowed on Sivaya Subramuniyaswami the title Dharmachakra for his remarkable publications.
- 1997 - Sivaya Subramuniyaswami responded to the US President's call for religious opinions on the ethics of cloning from the Hindu point of view.
- 1997 - Sivaya Subramuniyaswami spearheaded the 125th anniversary of Satguru Yogaswami and his golden icon's diaspora pilgrimage through many of the over 75 Sri Lanka temples and societies around the globe.
- 2000 - On August 25, he received the U Thant Peace Award (an award created by Sri Chinmoy) at the United Nations in New York. Prior recipients of this award were the Dalai Lama, Nelson Mandela, Mikhail Gorbachev, Pope John Paul II and Mother Teresa. He addressed 1,200 spiritual leaders gathered for the UN Millennium Peace Summit, with the message, “For peace in the world, stop the war in the home.”

== Books ==
Sivaya Subramuniyaswami was the author of more than 30 books offering insights on Hindu metaphysics, Shaivism, mysticism, yoga, and meditation. His works are highly regarded by many contemporary Hindu leaders.

His Master Course is Sivaya Subramuniyaswami's comprehensive treatise on Shaivism in three books and more than 3,000 pages, composed in what he called "talkanese" - a flowing version of written English that resembles the spoken language and evokes ancient Hindu oral traditions. His Master Course includes three books :

- Dancing with Siva
- Living with Siva
- Merging with Siva

Some of his other books:

- Yoga's Forgotten Foundation
- Loving Ganesha
- How to Become a Hindu: A Guide for Seekers and Born Hindus
- Tirukkural: The American English and Modern Tamil Translations of an Ethical Masterpiece
- Holy Orders of Sannyas: A Saiva Swami's Diksha and Lifetime Vows of Renunciation
- Weaver's Wisdom: Ancient Precepts for a Perfect Life
- Pancha Ganapati: An alternative for Christmas

== Four areas of service ==
The four areas of service established by Sivaya Subramuniyaswami and now carried out by his successor, Satguru Bodhinatha Veylanswami, and monastics, are: Shaiva Siddhanta Church, Himalayan Academy, Hindu Heritage Endowment, and the Hinduism Today international quarterly magazine.

=== Shaiva Siddhanta Church ===
The mission of the Church is to preserve and promote the Shaiva Hindu religion. Membership in the Church extends to many countries of the world, including the US, Canada, Mauritius, Malaysia, Singapore, India, Sri Lanka and several European nations

=== Hindu Heritage Endowment ===
Hindu Heritage Endowment is a public service trust founded by Sivaya Subramuniyaswami in 1995.

=== Hinduism Today ===
Hinduism Today is an international quarterly magazine founded by Sivaya Subramuniyaswami in 1979. It is a public service of his monastic order, created to strengthen all Hindu traditions by uplifting and informing followers of the Hinduism everywhere.

== See also ==
- Tirukkural translations into English
- List of translators into English
- Hinduism in the United States
