= Yogaswami =

Sri Lankan Hindu guru (1872-1964)

- யோகசுவாமி යොගස්වාමි
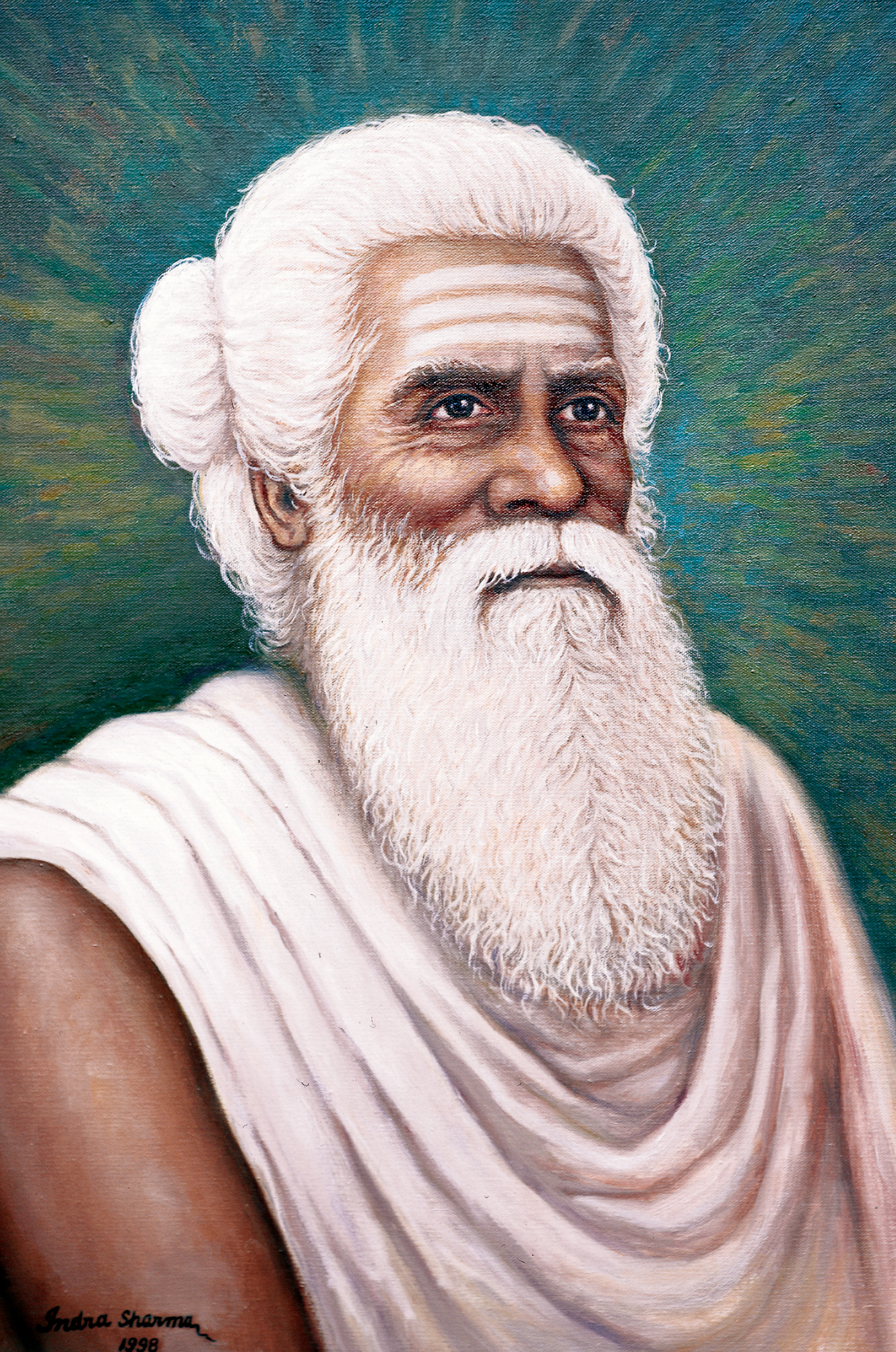

Personal life
- Born: Sadasivan; 1872 Maviddapuram, British Ceylon (now Sri Lanka)
- Died: 1964 (aged 92) Colombuthurai, Jaffna, Ceylon

Religious life
- Religion: Hinduism
- Sect: Shaivism; Shaiva Siddhanta; Nath (Nandinatha Sampradaya)
- Initiation: by Chellapaswami

Religious career
- Teacher: Chellapaswami
- Predecessor: Chellapaswami
- Successor: Sivaya Subramuniyaswami

Jnana guru Siva Yogaswami (யோகா டீச்சர் A பட சாமி) of Jaffna (1872–1964) was a spiritual master, a śivajnani and anatha siddhar revered by Hinduism of the 20th century. He had Catholic and Buddhist devotees as well. He was the 161st Jagadacharya of the Nandinatha Sampradaya's Kailasa Parampara. Yogaswami was trained in and practiced Kundalini yoga under the guidance of Satguru Chellappaswami, from whom he received guru diksha (initiation).

== Biography ==
Yogaswami was born near the Kandaswamy temple in Jaffna, Sri Lanka, in 1872. He would later attend St Patrick's College, Jaffna. His mother died before he turned 10 years old and his aunt and uncle took the responsibility of raising him. As a young adult, Yogaswami vowed to practice celibacy and renounced a place in his father's business, as he could not spare time to meditate and study the scriptures.

In 1889, Swami Vivekananda paid a visit to Jaffna which had a deep impact on the 18-year-old yogi. During his visit, a large crowd took him in a festive procession along Colombuthurai Road. As he approached the illuppai tree (honey tree), which later became the site where Yogaswami performed his tapas, Vivekananda stopped the procession and got off his carriage. He explained that the area around the tree was sacred and he preferred to walk past it. He described it as an "oasis in the desert".

The following day, Yogaswami went to listen to Vivekananda's public speech. Vivekananda started his talk with the phrase "The time is short but the subject is vast." This statement made a profound impact on Yogaswami's mind. He repeated it like a mantra to himself and shared it with other devotees throughout his life.

Around 1890, Yogaswami found a job as a storekeeper for an irrigation project in Kilinochchi. Here, he lived like a yogi, often meditating all night long. He demanded utter simplicity and purity of himself, as he would later of his devotees.

In 1905, Yogaswami found his guru Chellapaswami outside Nallur Temple. As he walked along the road, Chellappaswami shouted loudly, "Hey! Who are you? There is not one wrong thing! It is what it is! Who knows?" Suddenly everything vanished in a sea of light for the young yogi. At a later encounter in a festival crowd, Chellappaswami ordered him, "Go within; meditate; stay here until I return." He came back three days later to find Yogaswami still waiting for his master. Soon afterwards, Yogaswami gave up his job and everything else to follow Chellappaswami for the next five years. His life became filled with intense spiritual discipline and severe austerity. Following Yogaswami's ordination (sannyas diksha), his guru sent him away and never received him again. Chellapaswami died in 1915.

Yogaswami later spent years of intense tapas under the olive tree at Colombuthurai Road on the outskirts of Jaffna. His practice was to meditate for three days and nights in the open without moving or taking shelter from the weather. On the fourth day, he would walk long distances, returning to the olive tree to repeat the cycle. In his outward behavior, Yogaswami followed the example of his guru, for he would drive away those who tried to approach him. After some time, he finally allowed a few sincere seekers to approach. As more and more devotees gathered around him, his austere demeanor relaxed. He was eventually persuaded to occupy a small hut in the garden of a house near his olive tree. This remained his "base" for the rest of his life. Even here, he initially forbade devotees to revere or care for him. Devotees would come to him for help with all their problems, usually in the early mornings and in the evenings. Day and night, Yogaswami was absorbed in his inner worship. On one occasion, Yogaswami was seated in perfect stillness, like a stone. A crow flew down and rested for several minutes on his head, apparently thinking this was a statue.

In January 1935, Yogaswami had his devotees begin his monthly journal, Sivathondan, meaning both "servant of Siva" and "service to Siva." As the years passed, his followers became more numerous. Swami relented a little, permitting them to express their devotion by cleaning and repairing his hut. Nearly all his devotees were householders and engaged in some form of employment or other. Apart from one or two exceptions, he rarely advised them to retire from their employment. For him, the whole of man's life had to be made a spiritual practice, and he would not admit any division of human activity into holy and unholy.

In 1940, Yogaswami visited India on a pilgrimage to Banaras and Chidambaram. His letter from Banaras states, "After wandering far in an earnest quest, I came to Kasi and saw the Lord of the Universe– within myself." The herb that you seek is under your feet. " One day, he visited Ramana Maharshi at his Arunachalam Ashram. The two simply sat all afternoon, facing each other in silence. Not a word was spoken. Back in Jaffna he explained, "We said all that had to be said."

In 1961, the 89-year-old Yogaswami broke his hip while feeding his cow, Valli. Swami spent months in the hospital, and once released, needed a wheelchair. He still meted out his wisdom and guidance throughout his final few years. At 3:30 am on a Wednesday in March 1964, Yogaswami died at age 91 in Colombuthurai. The whole nation of Sri Lanka stopped when the radio spread news of his Great Departure (mahasamadhi), and devotees thronged to Colombuthurai and Jaffna to bid him farewell. Today, a temple complex is being erected in Colombuthurai on the site of the hut where he lived for 50 years.

== Spiritual lineage ==
He followed the Shaivism sect (Shaiva Siddhanta) of Hinduism, which is prevalent in South India, Sri Lanka and Malaysia. He belonged to Nandinatha Sampradaya's Kailasa Parampara thus creating a hybrid self claimed lineage

Self claimed spiritual lineage : Maharishi Nandinath → Sundaranandar, Siddhar who later becomes Tirumular → → → Kadaitswami → Chellapaswami → Siva Yogaswami → Sivaya Subramuniyaswami → Bodhinatha Veylanswami

Religious titles
Preceded by Satguru Chellapaswami	161st Satguru (Spiritual Preceptor); 1911–1964	Succeeded by Satguru Sivaya Subramuniyaswami

== Natchintanai ==
Yogaswami conveyed his teachings in over 3,000 poems and songs, called Natchintanai, "good thoughts," urging seekers to follow dharma and realise God within. These flowed spontaneously from him. Any devotee present would write them down, and he occasionally scribed them himself. Natchintanai teachings have been published in several books and through the primary outlet and archive of his teachings, the Sivathondan, a monthly journal he established in 1934 (see above). To this day, Yogaswami's devotees intone Natchintanai songs during their daily worship. Natchintanai is a profound tool for teaching Hinduism's core truths.

== Yogaswami's message ==
Yogaswami's message to the world is "Know thy Self by thyself" (Thannai Ari-தன்னை அறி) and the path to realise the self is the 'Sivathondu'. The one who is doing Sivathondu is called Sivathondan (Servant of Siva).

Four great sayings (maha-vakyas) in the Tamil language encapsulate his message:

- Oru Pollapum Illai: "There is not even one wrong thing."
- Muzhuthum Unmai: "All is truth."
- Eppavo mudintha kaariyam: "It was all accomplished long ago."
- Naam Ariyom: "We do not know.”

== Disciples ==
Among the thousands of devotees of Sivayogaswamy, four disciples followed his path. One of the four was Markandu Swamy, who worked for the Department of Survey in Sri Lanka before moving to Kaithady Ashram. Yogaswamy remarked one day regarding Markandu Swamy, "I kept him as a compass for you all." Indeed, Markandu Swamy was the perfect embodiment of the teachings of Yogaswamy.

The second of the four was Chellathurai Swamy, who was principal and later became a disciple of Yogaswamy. Chellathurai Swamy devoted his entire life to putting the correct path to Sivathondan Centers (Two Sivathondan Nilayam at Jaffna and Batticaloa) after attaining highest wisdom.

The third of the four was Santhaswamy, who was the son of Lord Viscount Soulbury, who was the last Governor-General of Ceylon during the British colonial period. His original name was James Ramsbotham and he had a master's degree in philosophy. He dedicated his life to realizing the truth and highest wisdom, and to that end, he sought spiritual teachers in the west, including P. D. Ouspensky for a time. However, later on he found out about Yogaswamy, followed his path, and realised the self.

The fourth of the four was Satguru Sivaya Subramuniyaswami, a young enlightened American in search of his guru. Yogaswami gave him the name Subramuniya. Jnanaguru Yogaswami initiated Subramuniya into the holy orders of sannyasa and ordained him into his lineage with a tremendous slap on the back. Subramuniya took Yogaswami's message back to America. He fulfilled his mission by building two temples of his own, giving blessings to dozens of groups to build temples in North America, Australia, New Zealand, Europe and elsewhere; he gifted Deity images to 36 temples to begin the worship and establishing the Hindu Heritage Endowment to support Hindu temples, organisations, relief efforts, publications and other institutions and projects worldwide. Yogaswami continued to communicate with Subramuniya through Kandiah Chettiar until his death in 1964. In the line of succession, Sivaya Subramuniyaswami was considered the 162nd Jagadacharya of the Nandinatha Sampradaya's Kailasa Parampara.

Another disciple of Yogaswami was the late Pundit K N Navaratnam of Navalar Road, Jaffna. He emigrated to Melbourne, Australia and set up the Sivathondan Nilayam centre in Hallam, which has been running for over two decades. This meditation centre now has a temple precinct with a life-size lingam, rare vels and the Yogaswami vigraha. Pundit Navaratnam was a clairvoyant Vedic astrologer born on 4 March 1927, on the night of Shivaratri. He was the national astrologer of Sri Lanka and Australia. He has published several books, with two major works being The Numerical Key to Success and Junior Senior, both dedicated to his spiritual Guru Sri Yogaswami. Pundit Navaratnam attained nirvikalpa Samadhi on 6 December 2006.
