= Relationship of the Tamils with the Chinese =

Historical geopolitical and maritime relations between Tamil realms and imperial China

Tamils maintained a complex and enduring relationship with the Chinese, representing one of the most significant trans-oceanic dynamics in pre-modern global history. Interactions between Tamil polities - primarily the Pallava and Chola empires - and the Han, Tang, Song, and Yuan dynasties encompassed commercial trade, joint military alliances, naval interventions to secure global trade routes, and the establishment of permanent Tamil merchant guild settlements in Chinese treaty ports.

The Chola Empire at its greatest extent, during the reign of Rajendra Chola I in 1030 CE

== Early Contacts (Han Dynasty) ==
The earliest recorded diplomatic and commercial contacts between the Tamil region and imperial China appear in the official dynastic histories of the Western Han dynasty. The principal textual authority for this period is the Book of Han (Hanshu, 漢書), compiled by the historian Ban Gu (32–92 CE). According to Ban Gu, Han imperial envoys set sail during the reign of Emperor Wu of Han (141–87 BCE) from the southern Chinese port of Hepu, navigating across the South China Sea and the Bay of Bengal to reach a distant maritime kingdom named Huangzhi (黃支).

Historiographical consensus among Sinologists and Indologists firmly identifies Huangzhi (Archaic Chinese: Kwang-ts'ieh) as Kanchipuram, the ancient political and cultural capital of the Pallava dynasty in present-day Tamil Nadu. The Hanshu describes Huangzhi as a large, populous, and economically sophisticated realm. Chinese envoys carried substantial reserves of imperial gold and silk to purchase South Asian luxury items, notably "luminous pearls" (mingzhu, 明珠) and bi liuli (high-grade translucent glass beads or lapis lazuli manufactured in Tamil workshops).

== Pallava-Tang Military Alliance ==
By the 8th century CE, relations between the Tamil realm and imperial China evolved from commercial exchange into formal military and geopolitical alliance politics. This alignment took place under the Pallava monarch Narasimhavarman II (Rajasimha, r. 700–728 CE) and the Tang Emperor Xuanzong (r. 712–756 CE).

During this era, the expansion of the Tibetan Empire created a severe security crisis for the Tang court. To counter this threat, the Tang empire sought military alliances with powerful states on the southern periphery. Official Tang records, including the Cefu Yuangui and Old Book of Tang, document that in 720 CE, King Narasimhavarman II sent an imperial embassy to the Tang capital of Luoyang. The Pallava king offered to deploy his state's military forces - specifically war elephants and armored infantry - to launch a joint campaign against Tibetan forces.

Emperor Xuanzong recognized the strategic value of this alliance and issued an imperial decree conferring upon Narasimhavarman II the title Che-li-lo-pai-ta-pan-ma (a Chinese phonetic transcription of Siri Narasimhavarman) and "King of the Kingdom of South India" (Nan Tianzhu Guowang). The Tang emperor also presented the Pallava ambassador with an imperial robe of honor and an official state seal.

During this period, Kanchipuram was also an ancient center of Buddhism and learning visited by the Chinese traveller Xuanzang, who recorded that the city was a center of learning for Tamil, Prakrit, Pali, and Sanskrit. Buddhist Monks Buddhabadra and Bodhidharma travelled from Tamizhagam to China and established the Shaolin Monastery to spread Zen Buddhism.

== The Chola-Song Maritime Era ==
The relationship between the Tamils and the Chinese reached its economic and diplomatic zenith during the 11th century under the imperial Chola dynasty (850–1279 CE) and the Northern Song dynasty (960–1127 CE).

The premier diplomatic contact occurred in 1015 CE, when Rajendra Chola I dispatched a high-level embassy to the Song court. Detailed accounts of this mission are preserved in the History of Song (Song Shi). The Chola delegation comprised 52 members and took over three years to complete the long oceanic voyage from the port of Nagapattinam to Guangzhou, eventually traveling overland to the imperial capital of Kaifeng.

The embassy was led by a chief envoy named in Chinese records as Solisanwen and a vice-envoy named Pujiaxin (Abu Kasim, a prominent Muslim maritime merchant operating within Tamil trading ports under Chola patronage). The Chola envoys presented Emperor Zhenzong with valuable tributary goods including 21,000 ounces of pearls, elephants' tusks, and refined spices. The Song sovereign bestowed ceremonial court robes, gold vessels, and massive distributions of Chinese copper cash upon the Chola diplomats. Subsequent Chola diplomatic embassies were dispatched to China in 1033 CE (during the reign of Rajadhiraja I) and in 1077 CE (under Kulottunga Chola I, recorded in Chinese sources as Di-hua-jia-luo).

=== 1025 CE Srivijaya Naval Strike ===
A major turning point in Sino-Tamil maritime relations was Rajendra Chola I's naval expedition against the thalassocratic empire of Srivijaya in 1025 CE. Srivijaya, based in Sumatra, derived its wealth by enforcing a maritime blockade over the trade chokeholds of the Malacca and Sunda Straits, levying exorbitant transit tolls on Tamil merchant corporations attempting to trade with Song China.

To break this commercial monopoly, Rajendra Chola I launched a blue-water naval offensive in 1025 CE, capturing the Srivijayan Emperor and systematically reducing 14 strategic port cities across Sumatra and the Malay Peninsula, including Kedah (Kadaram). The destruction of Srivijaya's naval hegemony liberated the shipping lanes of the Malacca Strait, enabling powerful South Indian merchant guilds - most notably the Ainnurruvar - to secure direct trading privileges in southern Chinese ports like Guangzhou and Quanzhou.

== Yuan Dynasty and Tamil Merchant Guilds ==
During the Yuan dynasty (1271–1368 CE), established by the Mongol ruler Kublai Khan, the port of Quanzhou (known as Zaiton) became one of the busiest international emporiums in the world. Capitalizing on the open-border economic policies of the Mongol court, Tamil merchant guilds established a thriving merchant diaspora community in Quanzhou during the late 13th century.

The most significant archaeological evidence of this Tamil presence is a bilingual Tamil-Chinese stone inscription discovered in Quanzhou, dated to April 1281 CE. The inscription records the formal consecration of a Hindu Siva temple named Udaiyar Thirukkanisvaram by a prominent Tamil patron named Tavachchakkaravarttikal Sambandapperumal. Crucially, the inscription notes that the temple was erected in accordance with a firman (official written imperial decree) issued by Chekachai Khan, the Tamil phonetic rendering of Kublai Khan.

Over 30 structural elements and granite carvings from this temple were salvaged and built into the fabric of Quanzhou's Kaiyuan Temple during Ming-era renovations. The surviving relief carvings depict a rich Hindu iconographic program, including representations of Shiva as Bhikshatana, Vishnu, Narasimha, and mythological scenes from the Krishna Lila.

== Ming Dynasty ==
Zheng He, a Chinese mariner, explorer, diplomat and fleet admiral of the Ming Dynasty visited Tamil Nadu and Eelam and left the Galle Trilingual Inscription, a stone tablet with an inscription in three languages, Chinese, Tamil and Persian, in Galle, Sri Lanka. The stone tablet, dated 15 February 1409, was installed by the Chinese admiral in Galle during his grand voyages. The text concerns offerings made by him and others to the Sri Pada Mountain in Sri Lanka. The Chinese inscription mentions offerings to Buddha, the Persian in Arabic script to Allah and the Tamil inscription mentions offering to Tenavarai Nayanar (Hindu god Vishnu).

== Coins ==
Arrays of ancient Chinese coins have been found at places considered to be the homeland of the Cholas (i.e. the present Thanjavur, Tiruvarur, Nagapattinam and Pudukkottai districts of Tamil Nadu, India), further confirming the existence of trade and commercial relationship between the Cholas and the Chinese.

Place	Number of coins	Other details
Olayakkunnam	323	These coins belong to 142-126 BC. This village is situated in Pattukkottai taluk in Pudukkottai district of Tamil Nadu, India
Thaalikkottai	1822	This village is situated in Mannargudi taluk in Tiruvarur district of Tamil Nadu, India
