= Munneswaram =

Munneswaram may refer to the following in Sri Lanka:

- Munneswaram temple, a Hindu temple dedicated to Shiva
- Munneswaram (village), where Munneswaram temple is situated
