= Komakkambedu =

- Suburb
- Location in Chennai, India
- Coordinates: 13.1945°N 80.0295°E
- Country: India
- State: Tamil Nadu
- District: Thiruvallur
- Metro: Chennai

Languages
  - Official: Tamil
- Time zone: UTC+5:30 (IST)

Komakkambedu (KKB) is a village located 9 miles north of Thiruninravur. Most of the village is occupied by Vanniyar and Naidu caste.

This village is facing brain drain as many younger citizens have relocated. Farming is the occupation of most of the villagers.

More than twenty Self Help Groups (SHG) exist for the welfare and development of women.

There are four temples in the village, namely Mariamman temple, Permal temple, Pillayar temple and Chelliamman temple. T

A part of village is named Indira Nagar consists of two streets and temples namely Pillayar temple and Om Sakthi temple.

== Thimithi Thiruvila ==
There is a carnival function at the Mariamman temple every five years on the occasion of Thimithi (Tamil: தீமிதி) or firewalking ceremony. This is a Hindu festival celebrated in Tamil Nadu, South India and some other countries.

The fire-walking ceremony is in honour of Draupati Amman. During the period of the festival, scenes from Mahabharata ancient script are enacted by the devotees and drama troupes.
