= K. Kailasanatha Kurukkal =

Sri Lankan researcher (1921–2000)

K. Kailasanatha Kurukkal (Tamil:கா. கைலாசநாதக் குருக்கள் B: August 15, 1921 - D: August 8, 2000) was a researcher, writer and professor of Jaffna, Sri Lanka.

K. Kailasanatha Kurukkal at University of Jaffna

== Birth & Education ==
Born in an orthodox Tamil Brahmin family at Nallur in Jaffna district, he had his primary education at Mangayarkarasi Vidyalaya, Nallur. He had his secondary education at Parameswara College (Note: In Sri Lanka, higher secondary schools are called colleges) at Tirunelvely Jaffna. (Note: This school was closed and the Jaffna University was established in the same premises) He passed London Matriculation and Intermediate examinations.
He joined the University of Ceylon at Peradeniya and studied Sanskrit, Pali, Latin and English. He also had a working knowledge in German and French. His Sanskrit teacher was Prof. Betty Hayman who later had Kailasanatha Kurukkal as a friend and guide.
He completed his master's degree in 1948 and was appointed a lecturer in Sanskrit in the same university.

== Career ==
He completed his Doctorate in Poone University (India) He presented a thesis on A study in Epic and Puranic Periods and obtained his doctorate in 1960.
He continued his academic career at the University of Ceylon in Peradeniya.
He wrote articles for the University of Ceylon Review
When the Jaffna University was created in 1974, he was appointed the first chair of the Department of Hindu Civilisation there.
He was appointed Co-Dean of the Arts Faculty along with Prof.S. Gamlath, from June 1976 till December 1978 He was also appointed as the Head of the Department of Fine Arts(also called Ramanathan Fine Arts Academy).

== Hindu Religious Activities ==
He has been Chief Priest in a number of Yajnas conducted in Sri Lanka and Australia. He was one of the Chief Priests of Munneswaram temple in Puttalam District of Sri Lanka. It is one of the Pancha Ishwarams (five abodes) of Lord Shiva in Sri Lanka.

== Researcher ==
During his career he has done extensive research on Sanskrit texts, Hindu Civilization and has presented many papers in numerous seminars and conferences in Sri Lanka and abroad. In 1997, the Shruthi Laya Shangham in London was planning a dance drama on the subject of "Pancha Ishwaram". They approached Kailasanatha Kurukkal, who was attached to one of the Pancha Ishwarams and an authority on the subject. He supported their project and supplied research materials, ideas, suggestions, and strategies. All this culminated in the presentation of the highly acclaimed "Pancha lshwaram" dance drama at Logan Hall, University of London on 16 October 1999. Despite having lost his wife (Note: His wife, Thiripurasundari, has been of great support to him) recently, Prof. Kailasanatha Kurukkal graced the concert with his presence.

== Honours and Titles ==
- In 1988, the University of Jaffna conferred an honorary D. Litt on him in recognition of his contribution to the academic sphere.
- In 1982 the Association of Arts and Literature Journalists Friends held a function to honour him.
- In 1993 the Sri Lanka Government's Ministry of Hindu Religious and Cultural Affairs conferred on him the title Vedagama Mamani.
- When he retired in 1998, the university of Jaffna retained him as the Professor Emeritus.

== Books (in Tamil) ==
- Sanskrit Easy Tutor
- History of Sanskrit Literature - This book received the Sri Lanka Govt.'s Sahitya Award
- Rituals in Saiva (Hindu) Temples
- Hindu Culture - Some Thoughts

== Leader & Guide ==
He was looked upon as a leader and authority on Hindu studies and rituals in Sri Lanka. The small Brahmin community of Sri Lanka whether residing within the country or living abroad, always sought his advice and opinion before carrying out any important rites or rituals in temples and in their families.

== Death ==
He died in Australia on August 8, 2000.
