= Maradankulama =

Coordinates: 7°33′N 79°50′E

Maradankulama or Maradankulam is a village situated within the North Western Province of Sri Lanka. It is one of the oldest settlements within the geographic region that formed the medieval divisions of the country called Demala Pattuva. Most villagers speak Sinhala language but unlike the majority of Sinhala language speakers who are Buddhists, they are Saivite Hindus like the minority Sri Lankan Tamils. The village hosts an important festival dedicated to Ayyanar who is a popular village guardian deity. The village along with another predominantly Hindu village Udappu also sponsors a day in the annual chariot festival of the Munneswaram temple situated nearby.
