= Ketheeswaram temple =

Ancient Hindu temple in Sri Lanka

Thiruketheeswaram
- திருக்கேதீஸ்வரம்
- Location in Northern Province, Sri Lanka

Religion
- Affiliation: Hinduism
- District: Mannar
- Province: Northern
- Deity: Shiva

Location
- Location: Manthai
- Country: Sri Lanka
- Coordinates: 8°57′28.3″N 79°57′46.8″E

Architecture
- Type: Dravidian architecture (Koil)
- Creator: Unknown
- Completed: earliest reference 6th century BC, Reconstruction - 1903AD by Nattukottai Nagarathar of Tamil Nadu

Ketheeswaram temple (Tamil: திருக்கேதீசுவரம் Thirukketheeswaram) is an ancient Hindu temple in Mannar, Northern Province, Sri Lanka. Overlooking the ancient Tamil port towns of Manthai and Kudiramalai, the temple has lain in ruins, been restored, renovated and enlarged by various royals and devotees throughout its history. Thirukketheeswaram is one of the Pancha Ishwarams dedicated to the Hindu deity Shiva and is venerated by Shaivas throughout the continent. Throughout its history, the temple has been administered and frequented by Sri Lankan Hindu Tamils. Its famous tank, the Palavi tank, is of ancient antiquity and was restored from the ruins. Thirukketheeswaram is one of the 275 Paadal Petra Sthalams of Shiva glorified in the poems of the Tevaram.

Literary and inscriptional evidence of the post classical period (300BC-1500AD) attests to the upkeep of the temple during the ancient period by kings of the Pallava, Pandyan Dynasty and Chola dynasties who contributed to its development up to the late 16th century. In 1575, Thirukketheeswaram was largely destroyed by Portuguese colonials, with Pujas terminating at the shrine in 1589. Following an appeal by Arumuka Navalar in 1872, the temple was rebuilt at its original site in 1903.

== History ==
Early maps of Mannar

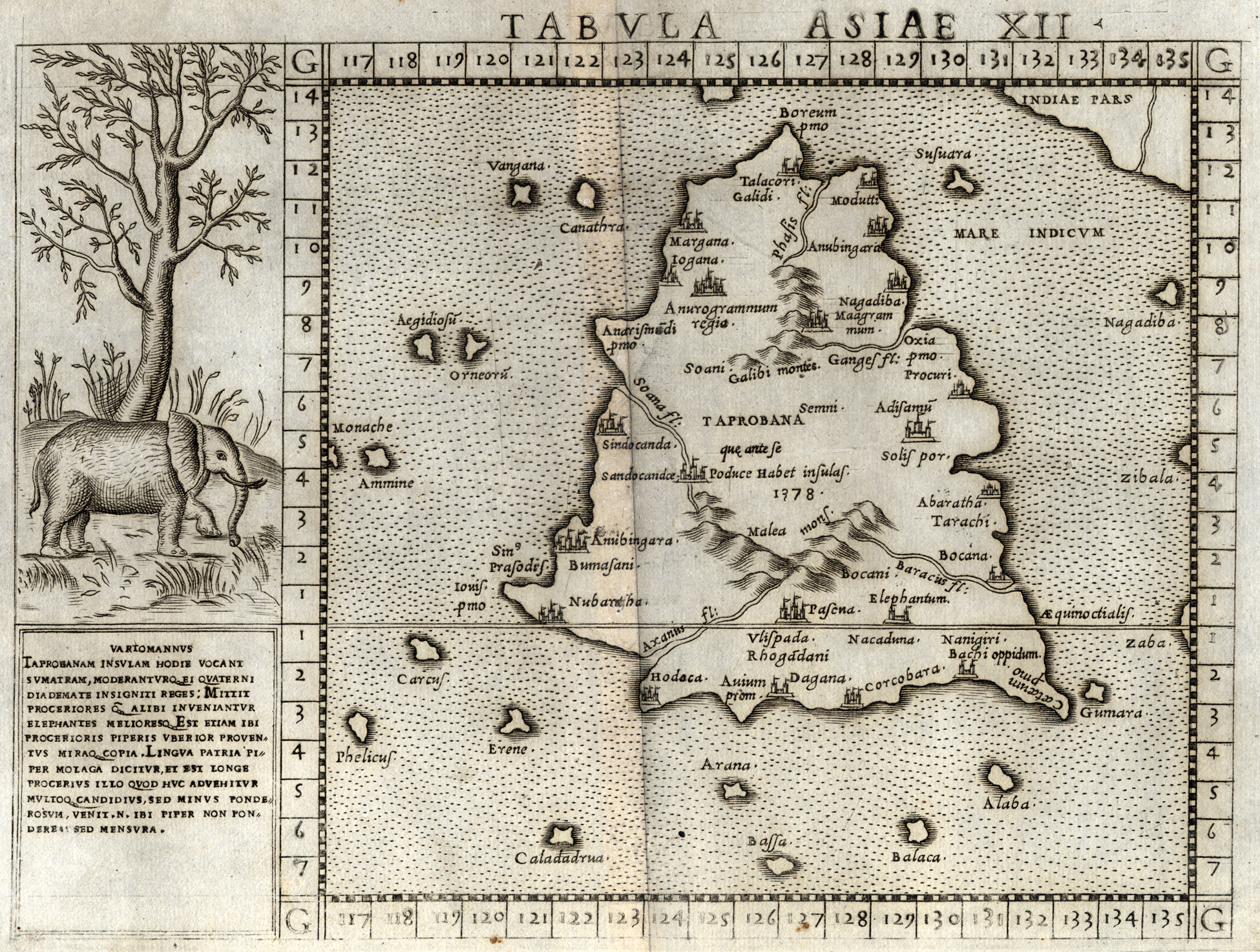
Ptolemy's map of Taprobana of 140 CE in a 1562 Ruscelli publication. From the Shiva footprint of Ulipada of Malea mountains (Sivan Oli Pada Malai) rises three rivers, including the Kavary-Kankai (Phalis) which flows into the place of Shiva called Thiruketheecharam at Manthottam in Mannar (positioned north here) where the temple is illustrated.

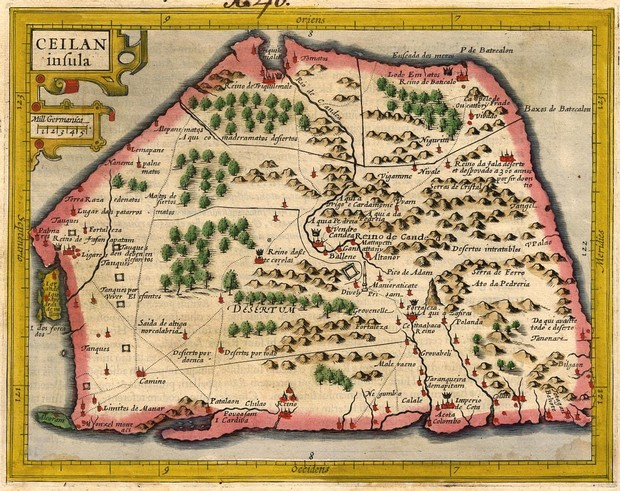
Hondius after Gerardus Mercator map of 1555, showing Mannar and its temples as situated on the western coast of the Tamil country.

The exact date of the Ketheeswaram temple's birth is not universally agreed upon. According to historian Paul Peiris, Thirukketheswaram was one of the five recognized Ishwarams of Siva in Lanka long before the arrival of Vijaya in 600 B.C. The shrine is known to have existed for at least 2400 years, with inspirational and literary evidence of the postclassical era ( 600BC – 1500AD) attesting to the shrine's classical antiquity. The buried ancient Tamil trading port of Manthottam (Mantotai/Manthai) in the Mannar District — where Ketheeswaram is located — has provided historians extant remains of the culture of the area during the ancient period. This includes the vestiges of its ancient temple tank (the Palavi tank), and the ruins of a former Hindu city built of brick, described by J.W. Bennet in 1843. During the ancient period, Mathoddam was a centre of international trade, with Greeks, Romans, Phoenicians, Arabs, Ethiopians, Persians, Chinese, Japanese, Burmese and others vying with each other to monopolise the trade of North Ceylon with Tamil traders. Mathoddam is currently viewed as the only port on the island that could be called a "buried city," with much of the ancient ruins under sand today. The existence of the Thiru-Ketheeswaram temple attests to the antiquity of the port. Mathoddam finds mention as "one of the greatest ports" on the seaboard between the island and Tamilakkam in the Tamil Sangam literature of the classical period (600 BCE – 300 CE). Hugh Nevill wrote in 1887 of the illustrious city of Mathoddam "A renowned shrine grew into repute there dedicated to one Supreme God symbolized by a single stone, and in later times restored by a Saivaite after lying long in ruins. The temple was dedicated as 'Tiru-Kethes-Waram.'"

One of the five ancient Iswarams of Lord Shiva on the island, Ketheeswaram joins Koneswaram (Trincomalee), Naguleswaram (Keerimalai), Tenavaram (Tevan Thurai) and Munneswaram (Puttalam) as a renowned and highly frequented pilgrimage site from before 600 BCE. In the 6th–9th century CE, the temple was glorified in the Tevaram canon, becoming one of 275 Paadal Petra Sthalams, the holiest Shiva temples on the continent. The only other Paadal Petra Sthalam from Eela Nādu (the country of the temple as named in the Tamil literature) is Koneswaram.

=== Chronology ===
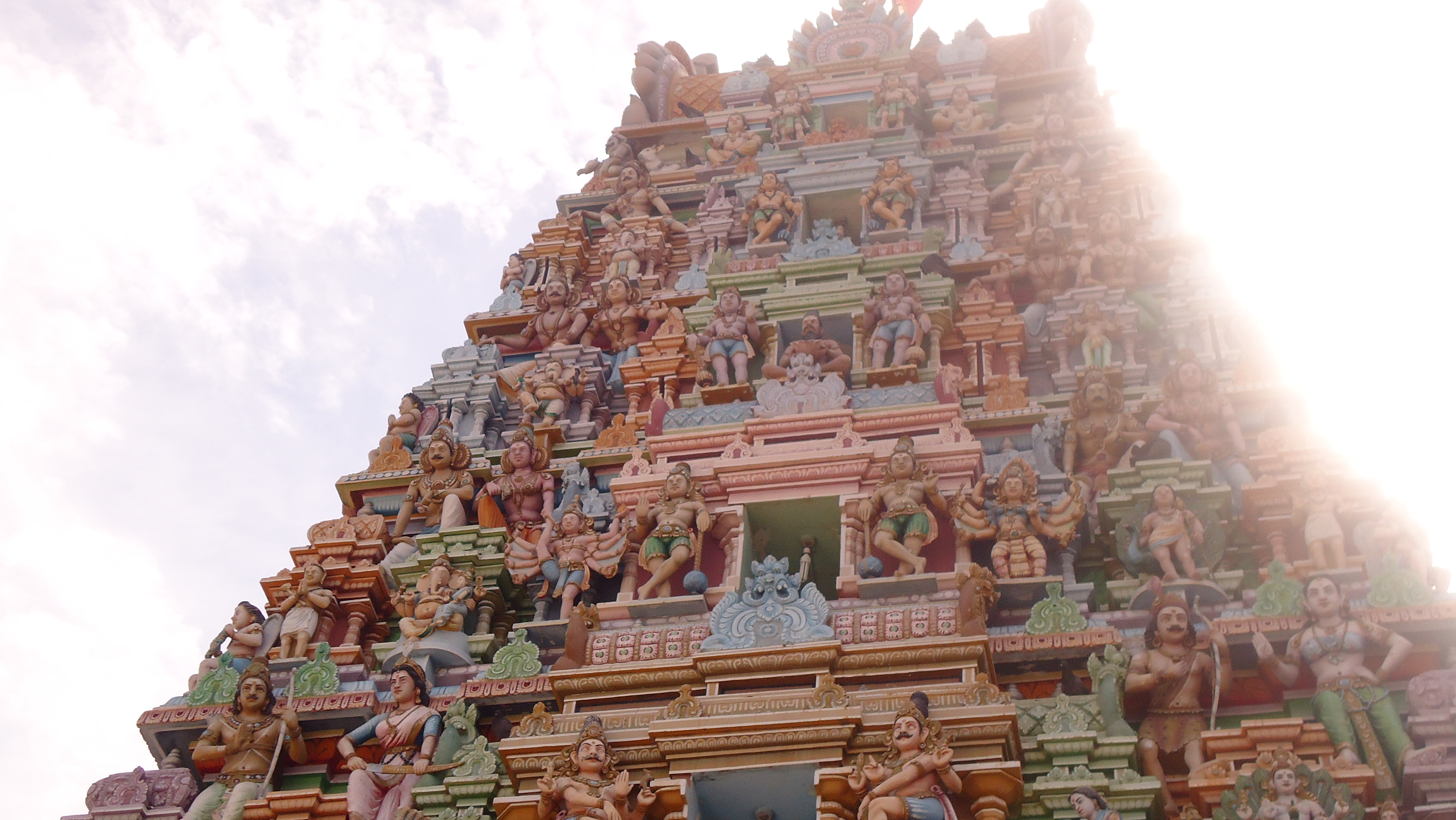
Thirukeetheeswaram, The great sivan kovil of northern province of Sri Lanka

Built by Naga People (Naga Tribe)

Thiruketheeswaram's initial installment is credited to the indigenous people of the Manthai port, the Karaiyar. The Karaiyar people claimed to be related to several classical period public figures hailing from the international port town, including the creator of the oldest extant Tamil literature by an Eelam Tamilian, the Sangam poet Eelattu Poothanthevanar.

6th–7th century hymn

Ketisvaram temple and the waters of the Palavi tank by its side are heralded in the Saiva work Tevaram in the 6th century CE by Sambandar. Along with Koneswaram temple on Swami Rock, Trincomalee, Ketisvaram temple and its deity are praised in the same literature canon by the 8th century CE Nayanmar, Sundarar, in the Sangam period. Tirukketisvaram henceforth is glorified as one of 275 Shiva Sthalams of the continent, part of the Paadal Petra Sthalam group. The only other sthalam from Eelam is Koneswaram. There is epigraphic evidence of maintenance of the temple by the Pallava and Pandyan dynasties.

10th century

Several Chola inscriptions from its medieval floruit refer to Ketisvaram and two Sinhala inscriptions of the 10th century refer to the prohibition on slaughtering cows at the town.

12th century

Dathavamsa, (12th century) speaks of a Hindu temple at Mantotai in the reign of King Meghavannan (301–328).

16th century destruction by the Portuguese

After 1505 A.C.E along with countless Buddhist and Hindu temples around the island, it was destroyed by Portuguese Catholic colonialists. The historian Do Couto recounts that the attackers encountered no resistance from pilgrims or priests while the temple was destroyed. In 1589 C.E. the temple stones were used by them to build the Mannar Fort, a Catholic church and the Hammershield Fort at Kayts.

19th/20th-century reconstruction

The original site of the Temple was traced in 1894. The Shiva lingam of the old shrine together with several other finds were also unearthed in 1894. After a gap of almost 400 years in the 1910s, local Tamils, under the urging of Hindu reformer Arumuka Navalar, came together and built the present temple. With the restoration of the ancient and holy Palavi Teertham or pond in 1949, a major effort was made to improve the temple environs. It was in October 1948 that an intensive agitation resulted in the formation of the Thiruketheeswaram Temple Restoration Society, which renovated the temple and performed Kumbhabishekam in August 1952. The Thiruketheeswaram Temple Restoration Society did further renovation of the temple and another Kumbhabhishekam was held on 4 July 1976.

As part of the civil war that has plagued the country since the Black July pogrom of 1983 the temple is currently occupied by the Sri Lankan Army. While granite work preparations were in progress, the army took over the Temple and its environs in August 1990 and continued to occupy the site for several years. Although they have left the Temple premises, their occupation of its environs is a cause of concern to the Restoration Society which has been urging the Government to remove the Armed Forces completely from the environs of the Temple and declare the site a sacred area.

== Legends ==
Mythical stories related to the Indian epic Ramayana recount that Mandothari, the wife of King Ravana was from Manthai and that Mayan, the father of Mandothari and the King of Manthai built the ancient Temple of Thiruketheeswaram to worship Shiva. According to one Hindu legend, Maharishi Bhrigu worshipped Shiva at this shrine. Another tradition holds that the Hindu planetary god Ketu worshipped Shiva at the shrine, thus creating the shrine's name "Ketheeswaram". Another legend is found in the Skanda Purana, an ancient work in Sanskrit, the antiquity of which is unknown. It consists of 2500 verses grouped into 27 Chapters and had been handed down in accordance with the traditional custom as oral discourses by the Guru to his disciples, in this case by Sootha Munivar to the Naimisaraniya Munivars. Three Chapters of the Skanda Purana which have been given the title Dhakshana Kailasa Manmiam deal with historical events in ancient Ceylon. The first chapter narrates about the Puranas in general and the splendour that was of ancient Ceylon; the second chapter relates about the celebrated places of religious importance in Ceylon and the story of "Thiruketheeswaram". In this chapter is narrated the incident of how, at one time long ago, the God of Wind (Vayu) uprooted the three towers of the great mountain Maha Meru in order to keep off Athichedan — who fought against him, obstructing the great mountain with thousands of adorned summits resembling serpents’ heads — and deposited one of these towers at Thiruketheeswaram. The Lord established Himself there, at Thiruketheeswaram. According to the Manmiam, Thiruketheeswaram along with Koneswaram are two of the nine most sacred sthalams of the Hindus. The other seven are in India.

== See also ==
- Hinduism in Sri Lanka
