= Tenavaram temple =

- දෙව්නුවරයෙහි දිව්‍යරාජ භවනය தேனாவரம் தேவந்துறை கோயில் / தொண்டேசுவரம் கோவில்
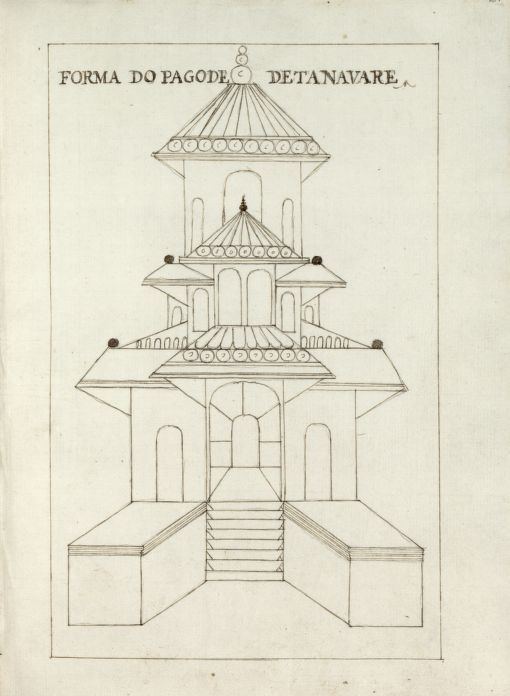

- Location in Sri Lanka

Religion
- Affiliation: Hinduism
- District: Matara District
- Province: Southern
- Deity: Tenavarai Nayanar (Lord Vishnu and Lord Shiva)

Location
- Location: Dondra Head, Matara (formerly Matura)
- Country: Sri Lanka
- Coordinates: 5°55′21″N 80°35′22″E

Architecture
- Type: Dravidian architecture (Kerala style)
- Completed: Tenavara Vishnu Kovil - Vishnu shrine - 659 - 661 CE by King Dappula Sen and Rama Chandra; Tenavara Ganeshwara Kovil - Ganesh Shrine - 659 - 661 CE by Rama Chandra; Tenavara Naga Risa Nila Kovil - Shiva Shrine - CE, exact date unknown
- Temple: 8
- Inscriptions: 6

Tenavaram temple (Tamil: தொண்டேசுவரம் கோயில் Sinhala: දෙවිනුවර උත්පලවණ්ණ ශ්‍රී විෂ්ණු මහා දේවාලය) (historically known as the Devnuwarehi Divyaraja Bhavanaya, Tondeshwaram Kovil, Tevanthurai Kovil or Naga-Risa Nila Kovil) is a historic Buddhist-Hindu temple complex situated in the port town Devinuwara or Tenavaram, (Tevanthurai or Dondra Head), Matara near Galle, Southern Province, Sri Lanka. It is dedicated to the national god of Sri Lanka, Lord Upulvan. This god is known to Hindus as Tenavarai Nayanar and at its zenith was one of the most celebrated Buddhist - Hindu temple complexes of the island, containing eight major kovil shrines to a thousand deity statues of stone and bronze and three major shrines to Buddha, Vishnu and Shiva. Temple was richly endowed by kings of Sri Lanka from seventh century AD to sixteenth century AD. The Administration and maintenance was conducted by residing Hindu Tamil merchants along with surrounding temple owned villages of Sinhalese during Tenavaram's time as a popular pilgrimage destination and famed emporium employing over five hundred devadasis.

The complex, bordered by a large quadrangle cloister, was a collection of a Buddhist Vihara several historic Hindu Kovil shrines, with its principle shrine designed in the Kerala and Pallava style of Dravidian architecture. The central temple dedicated to Vishnu (Tenavarai Nayanar) known as Upulvan to the Sinhalese was the most prestigious and biggest, popular amongst its large Tamil population, pilgrims and benefactors of other faiths such as Buddhism, kings and artisans. The other shrines that made up the Kovil Vatta were dedicated to Ganesh, Murukan, Kannagi and Shiva, widely exalted examples of stonework construction of the Dravidian style. The Shiva shrine is venerated as the southernmost of the ancient Pancha Ishwarams of Lord Shiva (called Tondeswaram), built at coastal points around the circumference of the island in the classical period.

The Tenavaram temple owned the entire property and land of the town and the surrounding villages, ownership of which was affirmed through several royal grants in the early medieval period. Its keepers lived along streets of its ancient agraharam within the complex. Due to patronage by various royal dynasties and pilgrims across Asia, it became one of the most important surviving buildings of the classical Dravidian architectural period by the late 16th century.

The temple compound was destroyed by Portuguese colonial Thome de Sousa d'Arronches, who devastated the entire southern coast. The property was then handed over to Catholics. Tenavaram's splendor and prominence ranked it in stature alongside the other famous Pallava-developed medieval Hindu temple complex in the region, Koneswaram of Trincomalee. Excavations at the complex mandapam's partially buried ruins of granite pillars, stairs and slab stonework over the entire town have led to numerous findings. Reflecting the high points of Pallava artistic influence and contributions to the south of the island are the temple's 5th- to 7th-century statues of Ganesh, the Lingam, sculpture of Nandi and the Vishnu shrine's 10th-century Makara Thoranam (stone gateway), the frame and lintel of which include small guardians, a lustrated Lakshmi, dancers, musicians, ganas, and yali-riders.

Tenavaram temple was built on vaulted arches on the promontory overlooking the Indian Ocean. The central gopuram tower of the vimana and the other gopura towers that dominated the town were covered with plates of gilded brass, gold and copper on their roofs. Its outer body featured intricately carved domes, with elaborate arches and gates opening to various verandas and shrines of the complex, giving Tenavaram the appearance of a golden city to sailors who visited the port to trade and relied on its light reflecting gopura roofs for navigational purposes.

== Etymology ==
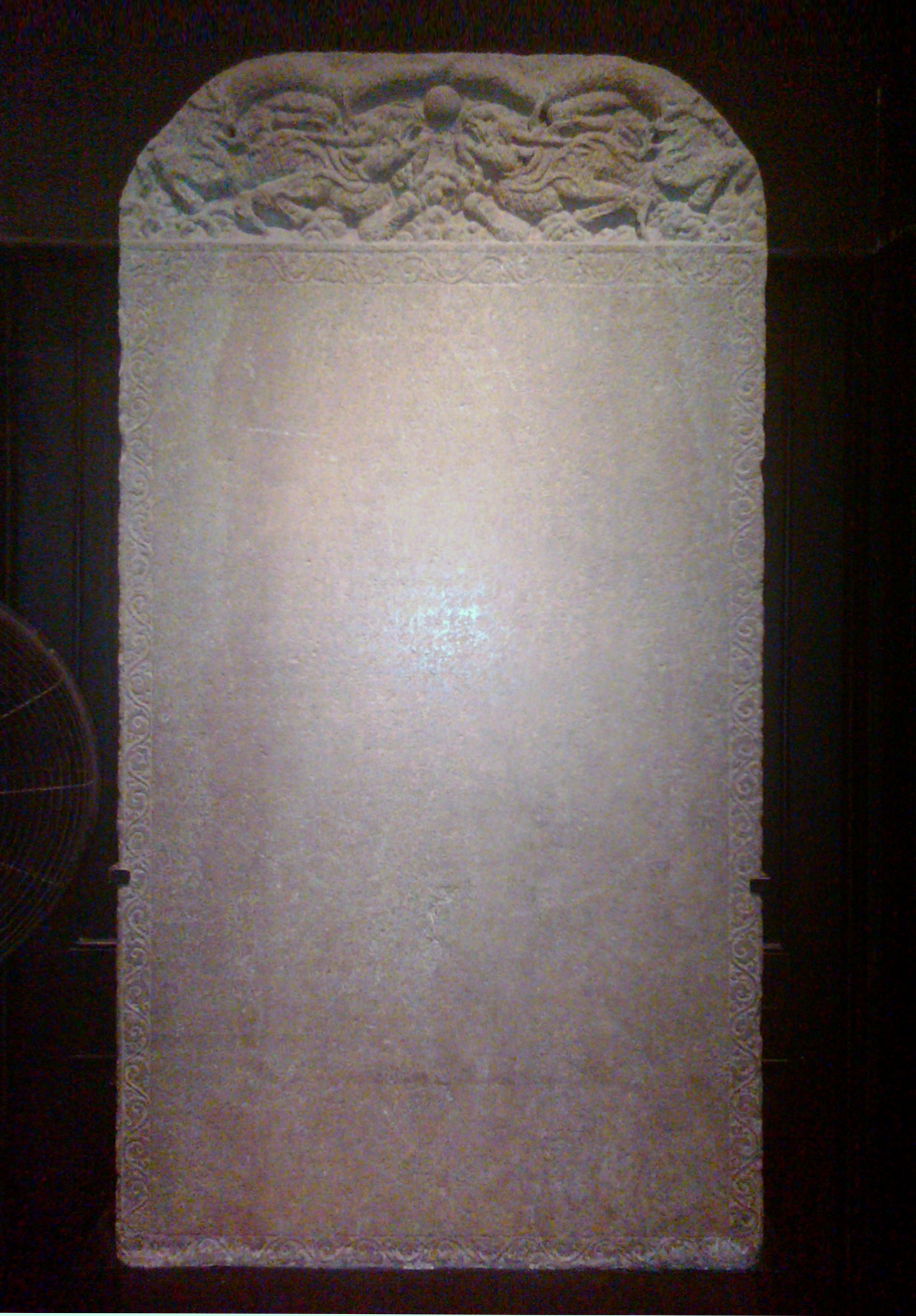
Galle Trilingual Inscription of 1411 CE erected by Chinese Admiral Zheng He mentions the main deity of Tenavarm temple as displayed in the Colombo National Museum of Sri Lanka in December 2011.

Dondra Head is known historically in Tamil as Then-thurai, Tevan-thurai, Tennavan-thurai, Tendhira Thottam, Tenavaram and Tanaveram which are variations of the same meaning "Lord of the Southern Port" in the language. Then or Ten is an anglicized form of the Tamil word for South while Tennavan ("Southerner") is a historic epithet denoting the Hindu God Shiva in the language, used by Tamil poets and simultaneously used as an honorable description of several Pandyan kings. Tevan is God, Thurai means port, Thottam means "estate" while varam or waram denotes the Lord's abode Iswaram. The shrines' primary deity Vishnu shared the name of the town, Tenavarai Nayanar, at the southernmost point of the island. The northernmost Vishnu shrine of the island, Vallipuram Vishnu Kovil, houses the ancient deity Vallipuram Alwar following a similar naming tradition.

The Ganesh shrine of the temple was known as the Ganeshwaran Kovil and the Shiva shrine of the complex was known as Naga-Risa Nila Kovil. This name is possibly etymologically related to Nagareshu, from the famous phrase Nagareshu Kanchi coined by the 5th-century poet Kalidasa in describing Kanchipuram as the "best city." Nila means blue while Kovil or Koil means a Tamil Hindu temple in Tamil. The whole complex was the southernmost shrine of the five ancient Iswarams of Lord Shiva on the island of classical antiquity along with Koneswaram (Trincomalee), Naguleswaram (Keerimalai), Thiruketheeshwaram (Mannar) and Munneswaram (Puttalam).

In Pali the town is called Devapura and Devanagara. In Sinhalese it has been referred to as Devinuwara, meaning City of Gods and Devundara.

In English today the town is known as Dondra or Dondera. It was a prolific sea port and capital city in medieval Sri Lanka and housed merchants from around Asia, amongst whom were many traders from Tamil Nadu.

== History ==
=== Early history ===
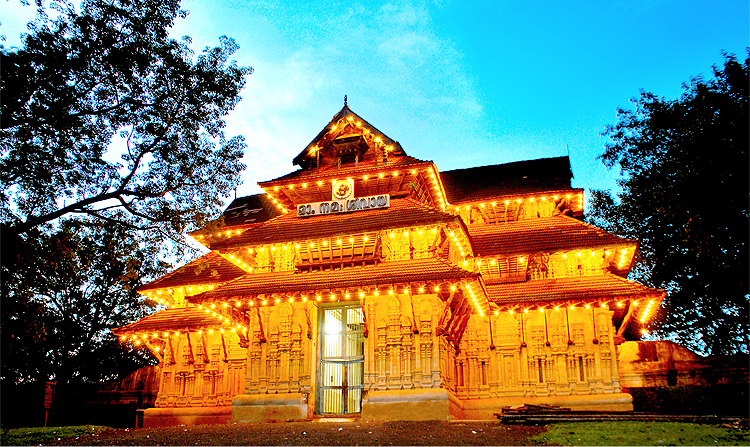
The famous Vadakkunnathan Temple of Thrissur, Kerala. Tenavaram shared strong structurally similar gopurams to this multi-shrine ancient Shiva complex constructed in the Dravidian Kerala style of architecture.

A map drawn by early Greek cartographers reveals the existence of a Hindu temple at the same location along the southern coast. Ptolemy in 98 CE marks the town as "Dagana" or "Dana" (Sacra Luna), a place "sacred to the moon," which geographers note corresponds to Tenavaram. In this temple the principal deity was known as "Chandra Maul Eshwaran". On the forehead of the deity was a large precious stone shaped like a moon crescent. The 18th century Tamil text Yalpana Vaipava Malai call the town Theivanthurai (God's Port) and the deity's name Santhira Segaram ( Chandra Sekharam ) or "Lord Shiva, wearer of moon on his head". This shrine became known as the Naga-Risa Nila Kovil of Tenavaram by the medieval period, and as "Tondeswaram", one of the five ancient Ishwarams of Shiva in the region.

=== Construction development in 6th - 8th century CE ===
There is scattered literary and archeological evidence from local and foreign sources describing the division of the whole island in the first few centuries of the common era between two kingdoms. The accounts of 6th-century Greek merchant Cosmas Indicopleustes who visited the island around the time of King Simhavishnu of Pallava's rule in Tamilakam reveal the presence of two kings, one of whom was based in Jaffna, home to a great emporium, who ruled the coastal districts around the island. This Tamil kingdom evolved from Nāka Nadu of the ancient Nāka Dynasty. Merchant guilds from Tamilakkam often built from scratch or maintained previously built shrines to Lord Shiva and Vishnu across South and South East Asia during the rule of Pallava, Chola and Pandyan kings. During the conquest of Ceylon by Pallava King Narasimhavarman I (630 - 668 CE) and the rule of the island by his grandfather and devout Vishnu devotee, King Simhavishnu (537 - 590 CE), many Pallava-built rock temples were erected in the region to various deities and this style of architecture remained popular and highly influential in the next few centuries. The temple complex was developed with a Pallava style of architecture between the 6th and 8th century CE.

One tradition states that a temple shrine in Tenavaram was constructed by King Aggabodhi IV in the middle of the 7th century CE, fusing Dravidian stone-made temple construction with a local interpretation. The Kegalla district ola manuscript found by archaeologist Harry Charles Purvis Bell records another popular tradition, involving the arrival of a red sandalwood Vishnu image at Tenavarai by the sea in 790 CE. King Dappula Sen was involved in restoring the Vishnu shrine of the complex during this time to house the image after envisioning its arrival in a dream. The manuscript indicates several Tamil pilgrims' arrived at Tenavaram at this time, and how the King granted its lands to the Hindus who accompanied an image of Vishnu. The Chief Brahmin Priest/merchant prince who brought the image was called Rama Chandra, (a name which alludes to Lord Rama, an incarnation of Vishnu). The sandalwood image was moved soon after to other shrines inland. Some scholars regard the story of a sandalwood image washing ashore to be mythical. A 17th-century literature source details that right after the washing ashore of the wood image, Tamil Brahmins versed in Vaishnava lore from Rameswaram in Pallava-era Tamilakkam were invited to the town to fashion and import an image of Lord Vishnu to Tenavaram. Other sources indicate the Tamils brought the statue to Tenavaram for safe-keeping as Rameswaram was under attack. Rama Chandra founded the Ganesh Kovil of Tenavaram in 790, located at Vallemadama on the sea coast, where the waves struck its walls at the Kovil Vatta. The Naga Risa Nila Kovil of Shiva was in the vicinity of this area of Tenavaram. Rama Chandra's name was recited daily at the conclusion of worship during the early hours of the morning. Hymns in praise of God were recited by Tamil priests attached to the temple. These priests settled in the established agraharam. In traditional Hindu practice of architecture and town-planning, an agraharam consists of two rows of houses running north-south on either side of a road. At one end exists a temple to Shiva and at the other end, a temple to Vishnu. Another famous example of this is Vadiveeswaram in Tamil Nadu.

The complex's many shrines are historically attested in grants, inscriptions and local literature. Epigraphical evidence in several languages found in the vicinity relate information about its shrines to Murukan, his goddess consorts, Ganesh, the goddess deification of Kannagi, Vishnu and Shiva. Tenavaram became a famous Tamil emporium over the following few centuries. A ferry transported traders, pilgrims and chroniclers from Tenavaram to the Chera and Chola kingdoms of Tamilakkam via Puttalam on the western shore of the island (then an extension of the Malabar coast and Hindu Jaffna kingdom) and the Gulf of Mannar from this time through to the late medieval period.

=== Floruit in the 11th - 16th century CE ===
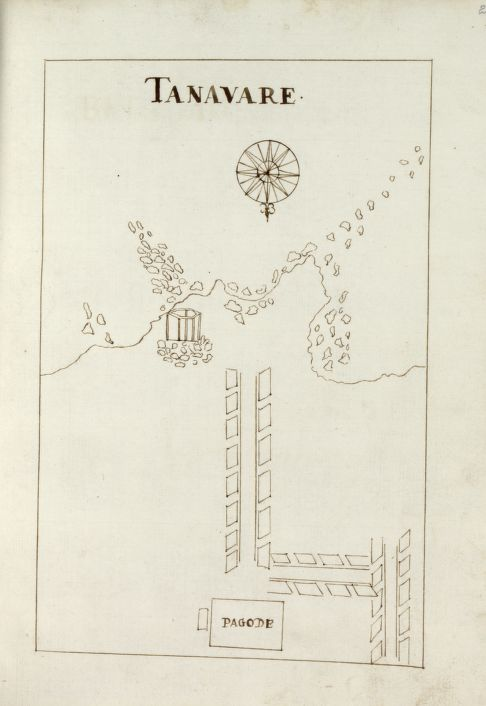
Location of the main Tenavaram Kovil shrine at Thevan Thurai, Matura near the coast, before the complex's destruction. Portuguese drawing, published c. 1650

The royal grant by Dambadeniyan King Parakramabahu II, who ruled from 1236 to 1270, contains references to donations to the Tenavaram Kovil, renovating the shrine and reaffirming its land ownership and regulations to prevent evasion of customs duties at the port by traders at the estate. According to this epigraph, Tendiratota and its lands that were religious endowments of old were duly maintained by the king. The port was administered by an officer titled Mahapandita. Those coming from foreign countries were not allowed to set up places of business without permission and royal officials were required not to accept gifts from foreign merchants. His epigraph also mentions the devalayam (a Tamil temple in formal speech) section of worship and Tenavaram's agraharam (brahmadeya or chaturvedimangalam) - the Iyer or Tamil Brahmin quarter of the heterogenous Tenavaram village as warranting protection. A close connection existed over a long period between the Iyers of the agraharam of Tenavaram and the kings who had exercised authority over the southern and southwestern lowlands. Pocaracan Pantitan of Tenavarai, who carried the honorary designation Tenuvaraipperumal before his name, wrote the Caracotimalai, a treatise on astrology in metrical Tamil verse. The author recited it in the presence of the king at the court of Kurunegal in 1310. A panegyric account of the royal patron at this court, Parakramabahu IV (1303 – 1326) of Dambadeniya, is in the introductory stanzas of this work. The author's honorific title, Tenuvarai-Perumal, literally means "The Prince of Tenavarai." Several other Tamil Hindus are mentioned with the special designation Tenuvarai Perumal in documents issued by the kings of the Kotte Kingdom in the 15th and 16th centuries, such as Bhuvanekabahu VII of Kotte. Among the names of many Hindus listed in the Kudumirissa Inscription are included those of two individuals who had the designation Tenuvarai-p-perumal. They are Tiskhanda Tenuvarapperumal and Sarasvati Tenuvarapperumal. These "Perumals" were officiating priests of the temple and exercised authority over the administration of the town and the temple.

The Dondra slab inscriptions record the granting of lands to the Vishnu shrine in the fourteenth century. Endowments to the Shiva shrine and extensive donations of lands to it were made during the reign of King Alagakkonara, a Raigama chief who ruled the south between 1397 and 1409. The Naymanai inscription slab of Parakramabahu VI of Kotte (1412-1467), written in Tamil and Sanskrit in Tamil and Grantha characters found in a jungle two miles north of Matara by Edward Müller, mentions that the king gave fields and gardens in the villages of Cunkankola, Pakarakaramullai, Vertuvai and Naymanai as endowments to Tenavaram. The grant was made for the specific purpose of providing alms for and feeding a group of twelve Brahmins at an alms-hall (Sattiram) named after "Devaraja", which was maintained regularly/daily without interruption (nicatam natakkira). The alms-hall was in the vicinity (iracarkal tiru – c - cannatiyil nisadam madakkira sattirattukku tiru-v-ullamparrina ur) or the premises of the holy shrine of the "god king" of Tenavaram. The conquest of Jaffna kingdom by Sapumal Kumaraya, a military leader sent by the Kotte king in 1450, was celebrated in the Kokila Sandesaya ("Message carried by Kokila bird") written in the 15th century and contains a contemporary description of the island traversed by the road taken by the cookoo bird, from Tenavaram in the south to Nallur ("Beautiful City") in Jaffna in the north. It and other extant Sandesas mention the Vishnu shrine of Tenavaram and some of the gopurams' three storeys. The Tisara Sandesa, Kokila Sandesa and Paravi Sandesa mention the Ganesh shrine's location on the sea coast of Tenavaram. The lands owned by the Shiva shrine were detailed by King Vijayabahu VI in a 1510 dated record. Early 16th-century copperplate inscriptions of the King Vijayabahu VII detail the land grants made by the king in the town on the condition that the recipient paid ten fanams a year to the Vishnu shrine. The grants were to be enjoyed permanently by the children, the grandchildren, and the descendants of astrologers and veda – vyasaru, including Tenuvarai Perumala, a son of (one of) them.

The Moroccan traveller Ibn Battuta visited the temple in the 14th century and described the deity Dinawar as sharing the same name as the flourishing trade town in which He resided, made of gold and the size of a man with two large rubies as eyes "that lit up like lanterns during the night." One thousand Hindus and Yogis were attached to this vast temple for services, with five hundred girls that danced and sang in front of the Mahavishnu idol. All people living within the vicinity of the temple and who visited it were fed with monetary endowments that were made to the idol.

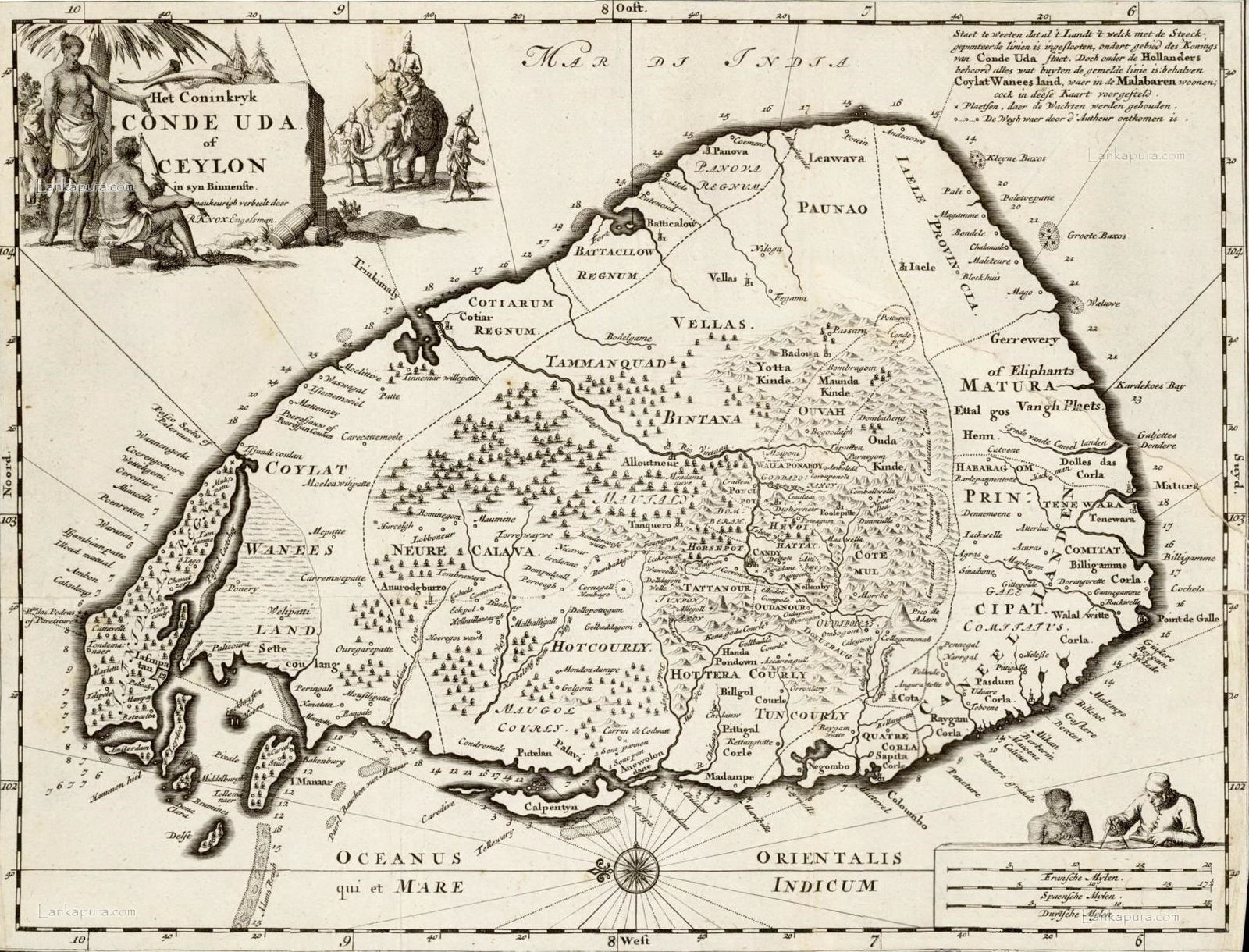
1692 engraving by Wilhem Broedelet of Robert Knox's 1681 map with Tenewara on the south coast of Matura

The complex received revenues from seventy villages. Substantial donations of gold, silver silks and sandalwood were made from the Chinese admiral Zheng He to Tenavaram temple in 1411 CE, as detailed in the Galle Trilingual Inscription. The text concerns offerings made by him and others to various religions including the God of Tamils Tenavarai Nayanar, an incarnation of the Hindu god Vishnu, on behalf of the Yongle Emperor. Several stone pillars here were erected through donation from Chinese kings, inscribed with letters of their nation as a token of their devotion to Tenavaram's idols. The chief deity mentioned and the donation of the trilingual inscription have also been connected to Shiva and his adjacent shrine - Nayanar were historic Saivite Tamil saints who worshipped Shiva and lived between the 5th and 10th centuries in Tamil Nadu. The admiral invoked the blessings of Hindu deities here for a peaceful world built on trade. Portuguese cartographers such as Tomé Pires who visited the island in the early 1500s describe Tenavarqe as an important trading and navigation port of the south, full of precious stones.

Tenavaram's gold-copper gilded roofs earned it fame amongst pilgrims and sailors, due to navigational purposes and its contribution to the town's appearance as a "golden city." Encompassed by a quadrangular cloister which opened under verandahs and terraces to the various deities' shrines, the complex contained gardens of shrubs and trees which priests used to pluck offerings to the deities. The Portuguese historian Diogo do Couto stated that along with Adam's Peak, Tenavarai was the most celebrated temple on the island, and the most visited pilgrimage site of the south with a circuit of a full league, while his fellow Portuguese historian De Quieroz compares the temple port town's splendor to that of the Koneswaram temple of Trincomalee and states that Lord Vishnu was the primary deity of the destroyed shrine of Tenavarai.

=== Destruction ===
The Portuguese called the great shrine the "Pagode of Tanauarê." It was destroyed in February 1588 by soldiers led by the Portuguese colonial Thome de Souza d'Arronches, a naval captain. The temple was attacked to distract the Sitawakan king Rajasimha I who was laying siege to the city Colombo on the island's west coast at the time. De Sousa entered the complex to find it empty, giving up the temple to the plunder of 120 accompanying soldiers before looting its riches of ivory, gems and sandalwood, overthrowing thousands of statues and idols of the temple before leveling the complex and defiling the inner court by slaughtering cows there. The area was then burnt. Also destroyed was the deity's magnificent wooden temple car. De Quieroz, writing a century after the destruction, states that a large Catholic Church, the St. Lucia's Cathedral was then built on the temple's foundation by Franciscans, sufficed to maintain three Portuguese churches. Ruins of several granite pillars from one of the Tenavaram shrines and an intricately designed stone doorway retain Pallava architectural influence, similar to rediscovered pillars of the ancient Koneswaram temple that was destroyed almost forty years later. James Emerson Tennent describes Tenavaram as the most sumptuous Hindu temple complex of the island before its destruction.

=== Ruins and rediscovery ===
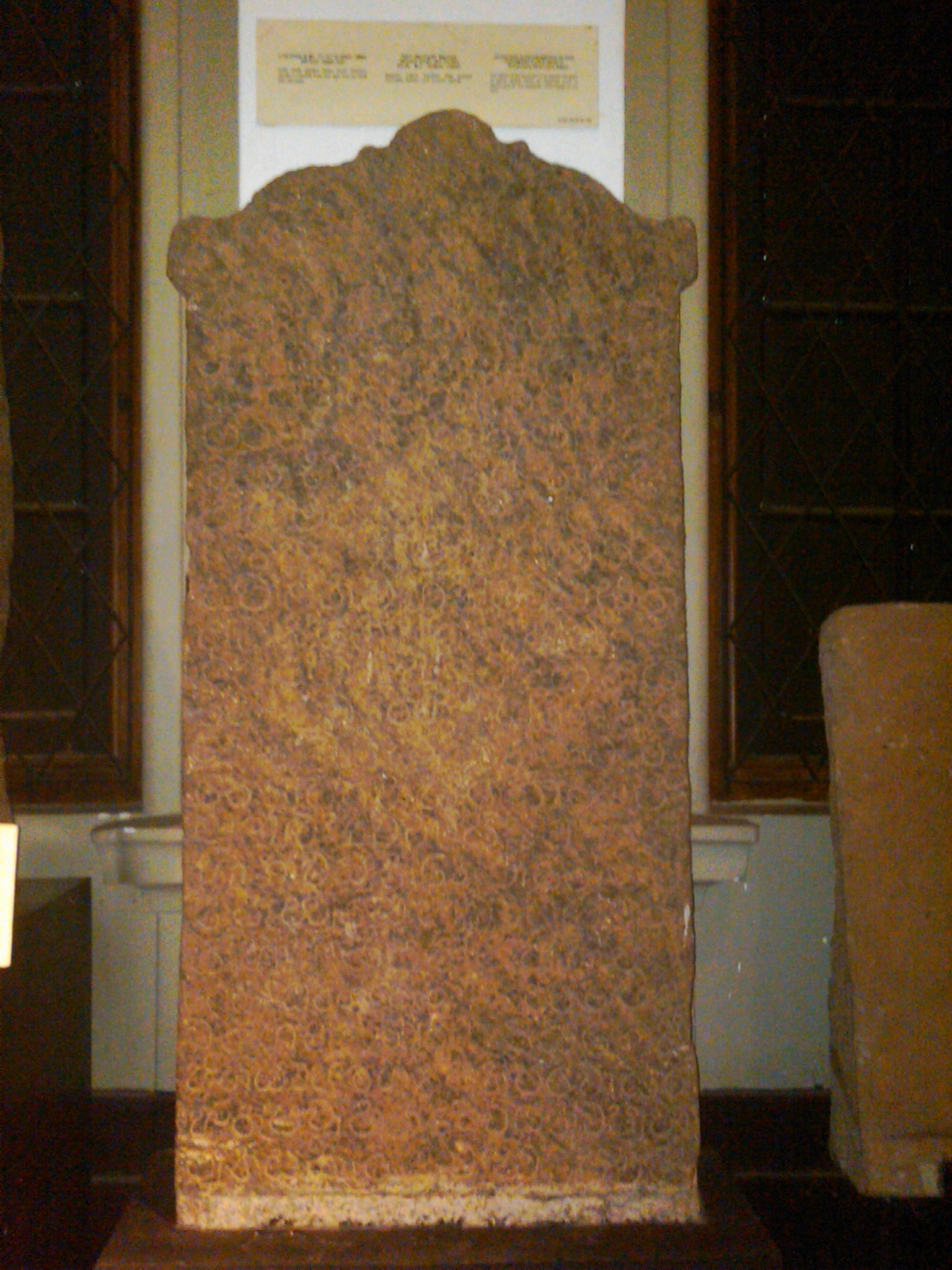
Donative Pillar inscriptions of King Vijayabahu V1 (1510–1521) donating lands to the Nagirasa Kovil (temple) of Tennavaram temple complex

18th-century chroniclers such as orientalist Captain Colin Mackenzie and the author Robert Percival described the Hindu ruins of several temples that they saw in the town as contemporary to the finest examples of surviving ancient Tamil architecture and sculpture of the Coromandel Coast of Tamil Nadu. The granite slabs, stone works and pillars of the ruins include several elephant heads and carvings of naked men and women and indicated lingam worship to the visitors. James Cordiner, writing in 1807, described the colonnade of 200 granite pillars having curved bases and capitals and others rough edged, forming an avenue to the sea, leading to an intricately carved doorway with several Hindu sculptures attached. He describes intersections of rows of pillars with this avenue proceeding to the right and left. Cordiner recounts the discovery of the ancient stone image of Ganesh worshipped in a mud hut at the site. The shrine's well had been covered by a stone slab. Another shrine dedicated to Murugan of Kathirkamam was also present and revered during his visit. Many of the stones of the ruins of the Tenavaram complex were used to build the Matara Fort by the colonists.

Sinhalese Buddhist temples of smaller size and a much later period had come to be erected over the Tamil Hindu ruins in some locations according to their observations. The discoveries of the late 20th century indicate that a Buddhist Vihara has come to be erected where the Lord Shiva or Ganesh shrine of the complex has been located by archaeologists.

=== 20th-century recovery of idols ===
A small stone building currently called the Galge or Galgane at Tenavaram that once is held to have supported a brick dome or upper storeys (Vimana tower) atop its roof displays a Dravidian provincial style of construction and architecture assigned to the late Pallava period with strong affiliations to the Kailasanathar Temple in Kanchipuram. Likely to have been the Vimanam-Garbhagriha or Sreekovil of one of the shrines, this building was reconstructed/repaired in 1947. It is a simple cuboid stone room structure with a flat roof currently atop its sanctum.

A Shiva lingam sculpture was found in the foreground of the Othpilima Vihara at the site in 1998 by a gardener along with a stone image of Nandi. It is 4 ft high and 2½ feet wide. A stone image of Ganesh and Nandi had been excavated decades earlier at the site Kovil Vatta - gardens of a newly constructed Buddhist Vihara in the Vallemadama area of Tevan Thurai.

The lingam's large size has led archaeologists to conclude it could be the principal idol of the ancient temple. The Avudaiyar or the pedestal of the Shiva linga is a thin slab; the upright or vertical portion is tall and slender. The Nandi ishapam (statue of Nandi) found with the lingam dates from the Pallava era. Other discoveries include statues of the Hindu god Ganesh and a goddess said to be Pattini/Kannagi. The garland decorated gateway to the original shrine, dating from the 10th century, is well preserved at the site. One of two styles of Thoranam to typical Kerala style temples, (lion-sea dragon or peacock crowned), the Makara Thoranam's (gateway's) frame and lintel include small guardians, dancers, musicians, ganas, and yali-riders. There is a lustration of the goddess Lakshmi in the center of the lintel.

== See also ==
- Hinduism in Sri Lanka
- Early Pandyan Kingdom
- Tissamaharama Tamil Brahmi inscription
