= Demala Hatpattu =

Demala Hatpattu (Tamil Seven Regions) or Demala Pattu or Demala Pattuva was a medieval and pre colonial division of Sri Lanka. It was a regional political division formed by royal land grants. There were number of such Pattus across the country. Demela Hatpattu was named as such because at its time of creation, it was exclusively governed by Tamil hereditary chiefs. The land was granted to Chiefs of Kerala Tamil Mukkuvar chiefs initially, later on given to Karava chiefs migrated from Coromandel Coast for services rendered or as a result of conquest by Mukkuvas. (See Mukkuvar and Vannimai)

The Pattu consisted of the following subdivisions

1. Panditha Pattuva
2. Kirimettiya Pattuva
3. Karamba Pattuva
4. Periavelli Pattuva
5. Muneswaram Pattuva
6. Anevilundan Pattuva
7. Kumaravanni Pattuva
8. Rajavanni Pattuva

Of which Muneswaram Pattuva alone had approximately 63 inhabited villages. It was believed that Chiefs of Munneswarm Pattuva began the Munneswaram temple as a village guardian temple to Munisvaran around 1000 CE. Within the Mueswaram Pattuva, Maradankulama provided the political leadership for the area. Demala Hatpattu formed a large division within the current Puttalam District. During the British Colonial period Demala Hatpattu transferred between numbers of provinces. In 1873, when the North Central Province was created, Demala Hatpattu was detached from the North Western Province but in 1875, Demala Hatpattu was reattached to the North Western Province.
