= Manthai =

Manthai மாந்தை මන්තොට
- Town
- Location within Northern Province
- Coordinates: 8°59′22″N 79°59′53″E
- Country: Sri Lanka
- Province: Northern
- District: Mannar
- DS Division: Manthai West
  - Chairman: (TNA)
- Time zone: UTC+5:30 (Sri Lanka Standard Time Zone)

Manthai (Tamil: மாந்தை, romanized: Māntai) is a coastal town and an ancient harbor situated in the Mannar district, of the Northern Province of Sri Lanka. Manthai functioned as the main port of the Anuradhapura Kingdom throughout its history.

Historically known as Manthottam in Tamil and Manthota or Mahathiththa in Sinhalese, it is an important religious site in the island for the Hindus, due to the Ketheeswaram Kovil, one of the five Ishwarams dedicated to Shiva in the island.

== Etymology ==
The name Manthai does not occur in any of the early works and it is a recent name use for the ancient port of Mahatittha. In early Sinhalese inscriptions and literature (5th century - 12th century), Mahatittha is referred to as Matota, Mahavoti, Mahaputu, Mahavutu, Mavatutota, and Mahapatana. In the Tamil poems of about the 7th, 8th and 9th centuries and in the Chola inscriptions of the 11th century, the Tamilised form of Matottam has been used. The present name Manthai is an abbreviation of Matottam.

The term Manthottam is mentioned in many ancient Tamil epics. Sinhalese epics jointly refer to both the town as well as the town of Mannar by the term Mahathittha.

The place was also known as Rajarajapuram when the northern part of Sri Lanka was ruled by Raja Raja Chola I in the 10th century AD as mentioned in an inscription of the Cholas found in Manthai.

== History ==
=== Ancient history ===
During the ancient period, Manthai was a center of international trade with trading contacts to the Red Sea, Persian Gulf, East Africa, Far East and Greater India as testified with archeological excavations. Coins of the Pandyan dynasty and Chola dynasty of the Sangam period were discovered in Manthai. With the likes of Arikamedu and Karaikadu of Tamil Nadu, Manthai was a major exporter of beads since the early first millennium AD. The Kuruntokai of Sangam literature mentions the Chera king Kuttuvan of Manthai. According to Dr. Paul E. Peiris, an erudite scholar and historian, Thiruketheeswaram in Manthai was one of the five recognized Eeswarams of Siva in Lanka very long before the arrival of Vijaya in 600 B.C

=== Rule of the Cholas ===
During the reign of the Cholas, between the 10th and 11th Centuries C.E., the town had developed into a major port, with many highways and served as an important link between the island and the mainland Chola kingdom.

Somewhere around 1070, Manthai, which was a thriving Chola seaport town came under attack from Vijayabahu, a Sinhalese monarch leading a military campaign to expel the Cholas from the island. The Cholas, who by then had lost control of most of the island, withdrew from Manthoddam, thus ending their century-long rule in the island. Under the rule of Raja Raja Chola I and his son Rajendra Chola I, was a Shaivite Hindu temple built known as Rajaraja Ishwaram Kovil, named after the king.

=== Buried city ===
Mathoddam is currently viewed as the only port on the island that could be called a "buried city," with much of the ancient ruins under sand today. The existence of the Thiruketheeswaram temple attests to the antiquity of the port. Manthoddam finds mention as "one of the greatest ports" on the seaboard between the island and Tamilakam in the Tamil Sangam literature of the classical period (600 BCE - 300 CE).

== Historical sites ==
=== Thiruketheeswaram temple ===
The Ketheeswaram temple situated at Manthai, is one of the five major Saiva temples in the island and among the 275 Paadal Petra Sthalams of Lord Shiva in the continent. The temple remains as a significant religious center for the Hindus in the country.

The shrine's initial installment is credited to the indigenous Karaiyar Naga tribe, The Karaiyars claimed to be related to several classical period public figures hailing from the international port town, including the creator of the oldest extant Tamil literature by a Sri Lankan Tamil, the Sangam poet Eelattu Poothanthevanar. Though there has been no substantial confirmations regarding the temple's original date of construction, the shrine is believed to have existed for possibly more than 2400 years together, with inspirational and literary evidence of the postclassical era ( 600BC - 1500AD) attesting to the shrine's classical antiquity.

The temple along with other major Hindu and Buddhist shrines of worship, was destroyed by the Portuguese conquests of the late 16th century and its very stones were used to build the Mannar fort, a Catholic church and the Hammershield Fort at Kayts.

The local Tamils under the urging of the famous Hindu reformer Arumuka Navalar rebuilt the present-day temple at its original site. Since outbreak of the Sri Lankan Civil War, the town and the temple has come under the occupation of the Sri Lankan military.

=== Palavi Tank ===
The Palavi Theertham is a tank situated near the Thiruketheeswaram temple.

The Palavi tank is nourished by the river Palavi, which had been the outlet of Matale waters via Malwattu Oya and other natural waterways of the extensive basin. The sacred Palavi Theertham, which was described in ancient Tamil hymns as sacred as the river Ganges, is used by the Hindus to offer rites and rituals for their ancestors.

An effigy of Lord Ketheeswarar is immersed in the scared tank as a part of the ritual bath, during the annual temple festival.

=== Ancient port ===
Manthai, known as Mahathiththa during ancient times, was situated north of the mouth of the Malvathu River (Aruvi Aru). There is evidence of an ancient river bed that ran close to the ancient port site that allowed for river traffic. This allowed for the development of Manthai as the main port of the Anuradhapura Kingdom, dating back at least to the 3rd century B.C.

During its early development Manthai likely traded predominantly with ports in India. After the 1st century A.D. Manthai appears to have developed into a regional hub soon becoming one of the most important ports in the maritime silk route. This is supported by various Persian, Sassanid, Greco-Roman, Indian and Chinese artifacts and coins that have been found during excavations.

An excavation by an international team of researchers in 2010 found archaeobotanical evidence of black Pepper, cloves and various cereals. In addition to these, pottery and semi-precious stones have been unearthed. These material were dated all the way from the 2nd century B.C. to the second millennium A.D., indicating a flourishing, cosmopolitan port.

While the Mahathiththa harbor and its river link to the city of Anuradhapura provided a valuable trade route, it also made the Anuradhapura Kingdom vulnerable to conquests with numerous South Indian invaders landing at Manthai and marching to the city along the Malvathu oya. The port seems to have diminished in importance with the collapse of the Anuradhapura Kingdom.

== Transportation ==
The town is situated on the A32 Highway that runs between Mannar and Jaffna. The town of Adampan is located 5 km east of Manthai. Other towns in close proximity are Vankalai, Uyilankulam, Achchankulam, Andankulam etc.

== See also ==
- Kudramalai
- Mannar
