= Udappu =

- Village
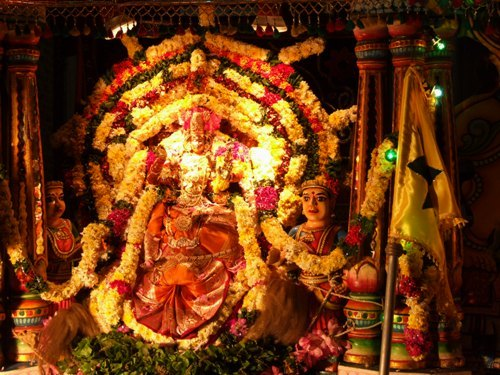
- The main deity at the Draupati Amman Temple, Udappu
- Interactive map of Udappu
- Coordinates: 7°45′0″N 79°48′0″E
- Country: Sri Lanka
- Province: North Western Province
- Time zone: UTC+5:30 (Sri Lanka Standard Time Zone)
  - Summer (DST): UTC+6

Udappu or Udappuwa is a traditional Tamil fishing, goldsmithing and shrimp farming village, situated 65 miles (105 km) north of Colombo the capital of Sri Lanka in the North Western Province. It is situated few miles north of Chilaw city and Munneswaram temple.

== Topography ==
It is a coastal village bordered on the west by the Indian Ocean and on the south by Andimunai sand dunes a noted tourist attraction. It also has the Mundal Lagoon to east of the village.

== Demography ==
The estimated population of the village is 15,000 people. The people of the village are Hindu Tamils and are generally considered to be Karaiyar caste. And other castes like, Ambalavanar and Asary(goldsmith). There are also Chettis. and practice their unique brand of Hinduism; their culture and lifestyle are notably different from other people engaged in fishing along the coast of Chilaw. Most of their neighboring villages belonging to the kindred Karave caste and are Catholics or Buddhists and identify themselves as Sinhalese.

Due to the continuing effects of the Sri Lankan civil war, there are also a number of Tamil refugees from rest of the country living in the village, specifically from the eastern Trincomalee district. People in the village are adversely affected by the effects of the civil war.

== Culture ==
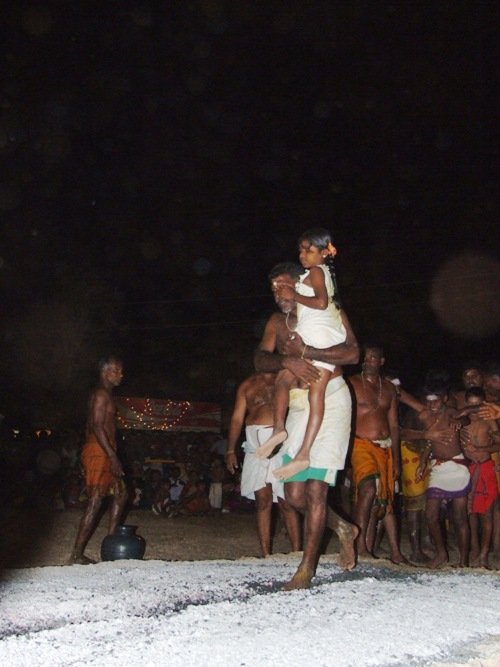
A father walking on fire with his child during the annual Hindu festival at the Draupati Amman temple in Udappu

The village is known for its elaborate Hindu temples and unique festivals. In the Tamil month of Avani which corresponds to late July to early August, an 18-day festival commences with the flag-hoisting ceremony and ending with fire-walking in front of Udappu's Draupati Amman Temple. The 18-day period is spent in prayer and fasting, with a priest reciting the Mahabharata epic to remind everyone of the story of Draupadi, the five Pandava brothers' common wife, whose chaste and virtuous ways enabled her to recover the kingdom they been deprived of by King Duryodhana. The Draupadi festival comes to a conclusion on the final evening when the entire male population of Udappu walk barefoot over a bed of red-hot coals without injury in a ceremony called Tee Mithi in Tamil language.

== See also ==
- Negombo Tamils
- Negombo Tamil dialect
