= Thimithi =

South Indian firewalking ceremony

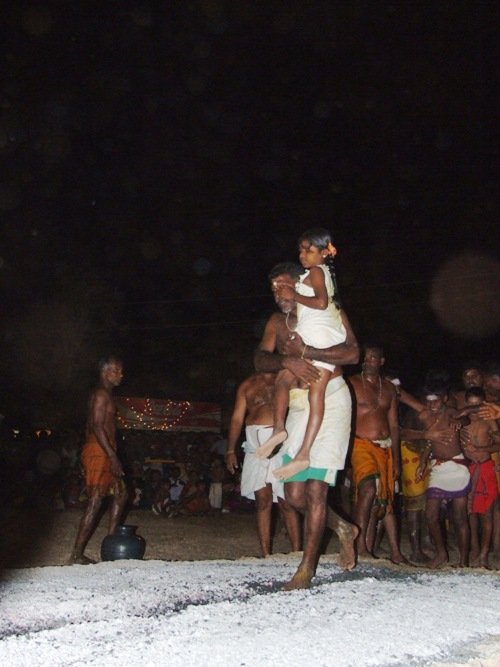
A father fire walking with his child during the annual Tamil Hindu festival at Udappu village in Sri Lanka

The Thimithi (Tamil: தீமிதி Kundam) or firewalking ceremony is a Hindu festival originating in Tamil Nadu, South India that is celebrated a week before Deepavali, during the month of Aipasi (or Aippasi) of the Tamil calendar (Gregorian calendar months of October and November). The fire-walking ceremony is in honour of the goddess Draupati Amman, who is considered the incarnation of goddess Mariamman, and is practiced not only in India, but also in countries with large Tamil populations like Sri Lanka, Fiji, Singapore, Malaysia, Mauritius, Réunion, South Africa and others.

In Singapore, the celebrations begin at Sri Srinivasa Perumal Temple in Serangoon Road around 10pm and the priest leads the grand procession of people through the streets to Sri Mariamman Temple in South Bridge Road where the actual tīmiti takes place. The priest starts the tīmiti by walking through the pit filled with hot burning wood with a karakattam "sacred water-filled pot" on his head. He is followed by male devotees intent on fulfilling their personal promises and proving their faith. The devotees may include a minority of non-Indians and non-Hindus.

== Events during the festival period ==
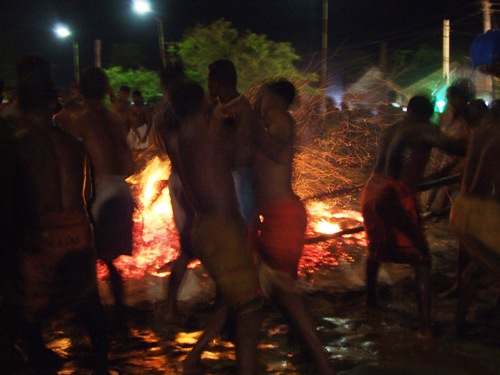
Preparation of fire walking pit at the Draupati Amman temple festival in Udappu, Sri Lanka

A home-made film showing a Hindu timiti festival at Sri Mariamman Temple in Singapore, 1913

During the period of the festival, scenes from Mahabharata are enacted by the devotees and drama troupes. A week before the fire walking they perform prayers to Periyachi who is one of the most important deities of Mariamman’s entourage. The grand prayer session is held to request her blessings upon the devotees and that no unpleasant incidents should happen during the festival.

The second event is a symbolic grand marriage ceremony conducted between Arjuna and Draupadi. Following this is probably the most important ritual: a simulation of the sacrifice of Hijra, which was done before the Mahabharata war to ensure success to the Pandavas. The simulated ritual does not involve human sacrifice.

Afterwards, devotees offer their prayers like carrying milk pots, doing Kumbiduthandam (prostrating after every step) and Angapirathatchanam (rolling around the temple grounds). Mariamman is given a milk bath with the milk that the devotees brought as it is a belief that the sins of man will be washed away.

Two days before the Tīmiti festival, a silver chariot procession takes place to commemorate the 18-day battle which culminates in the Pandavas victory. At this juncture, Krishna agreed to be Arjuna's charioteer. Marking this occasion in Singapore, on the Friday and Saturday prior to Tīmiti, a chariot procession takes place around the Telok Blangah and Bukit Merah districts.

The fire pit is prepared the night before the final day and kept red hot throughout the ritual. Devotees begin their ritual as early as 4 am and the event ends before 11am. It is believed that if they are truly devoted to Draupadi they will walk through the fire unscathed.

Some devotees suffer burn injuries on their feet. Injuries to children subjected to such rituals in Tamil Nadu have been reported. Reportedly due to unsteadiness while walking, children fall and often sustain injuries to other parts of their bodies besides their feet. However, studies have found that the prolonged suffering involved in this and similar rituals can result in feelings of euphoria for participants, an effect similar to the marathon "runners high".

== Manappakam Kanni Amman Kovil ==
The Kanni Amman Kovil temple located in Manappakkam a village near Chengalpattu, Tamilnadu, India is believed to be celebrating thimidhi thiruvizha more than 2000 years. More than 5000 people do thimidhi and many people do tonsuring (fully shaven head), earpiercing, make Pongal, Kadavettu (Goat-cutting) in front of the temple as offering to the Goddess Arulmigu Kanni Amman and celebrate the festival.
