= History of Song =

History of song (or History of Song) may refer to:

- History of Song, one of the Twenty-Four Histories of China
- History of the Song dynasty
- History of Song, a state during the Zhou dynasty
- History of the Chinese surname, Song
- History of Song District, in Sarawak, Malaysia
- History of Song, an airline brand owned and operated by Delta Air Lines

== See also ==
- History of music
