= Galle Trilingual Inscription =

Stone tablet erected in 1411 in Galle, Sri Lanka

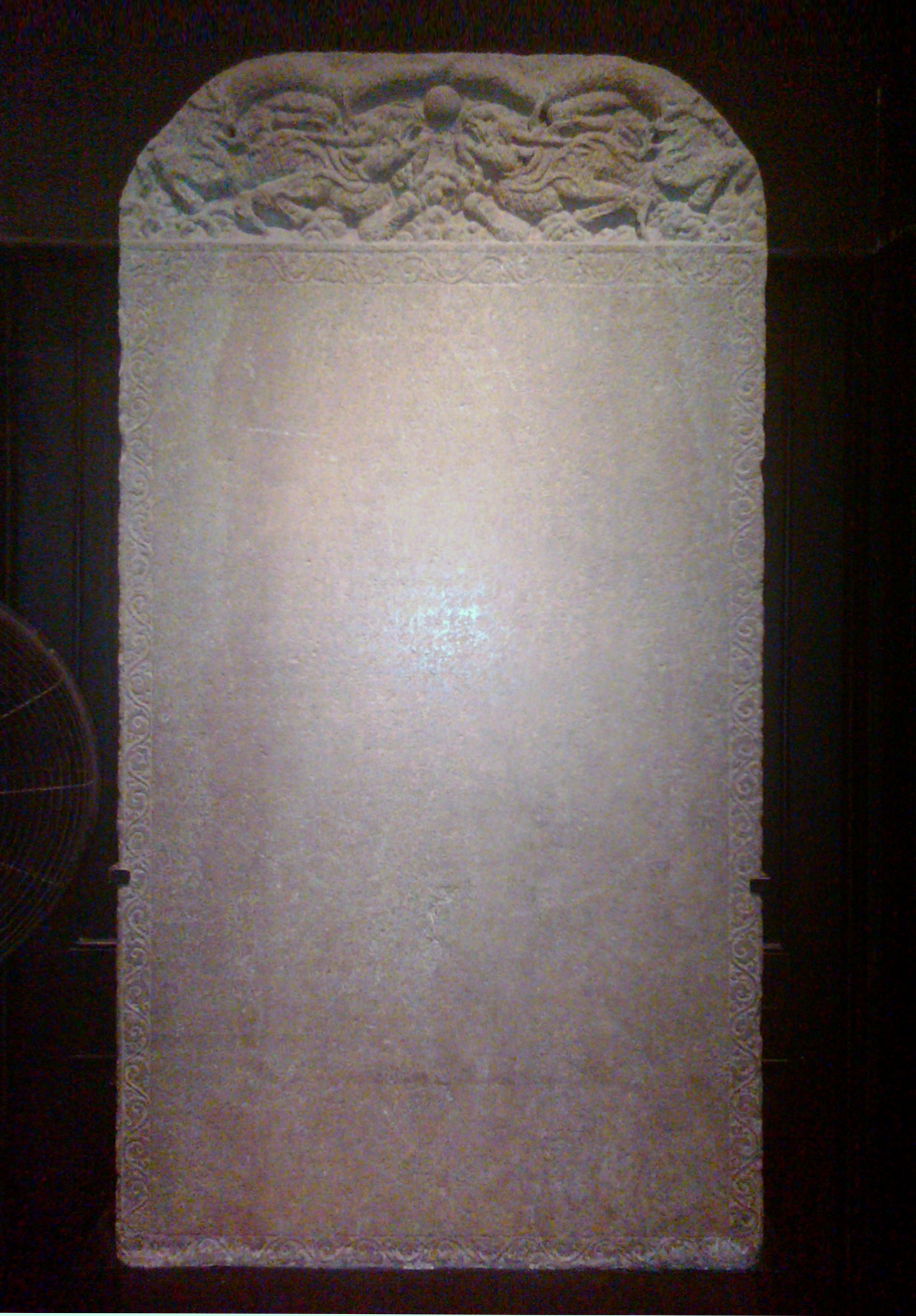
- Galle Trilingual inscription as displayed in the Colombo National Museum of Sri Lanka in December 2011

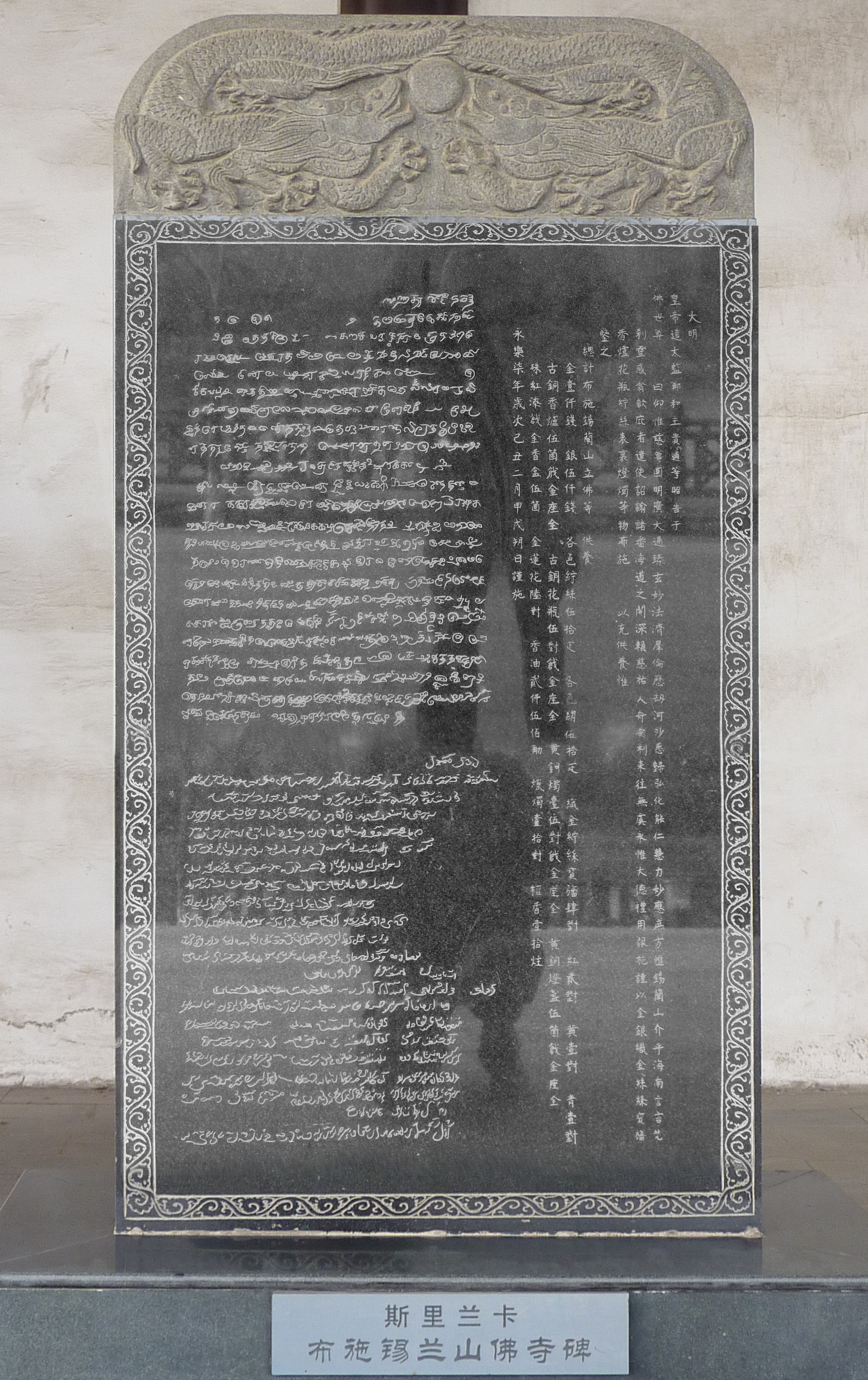
- Galle stele replica, Treasure Boat Shipyard in Nanjing
- Material: stone
- Size: 144.78 cm × 76.2 cm (4 ft 9 in × 2 ft 6 in)
- Writing: Chinese, Tamil and Persian
- Discovered: 1911; Galle
- Discovered by: S. H. Thomlin
- Present location: National Museum of Colombo

The Galle Trilingual Inscription is a stone tablet with an inscription in three languages, Chinese, Tamil and Persian, located in Galle, Sri Lanka. Dated 15 February 1409, it was installed by the Chinese admiral Zheng He in Galle during his grand voyages.

The text concerns offerings made by him and others to the mountain Sri Pada (Adam's Peak) in Sri Lanka. The Chinese inscription mentions offerings to Buddha, the Persian in Perso-Arabic script to Allah and the Tamil inscription mentions offering to Tenavarai Nayanar (Hindu god Vishnu). The admiral invoked the blessings of Hindu deities here for a peaceful world built on trade.

On his third voyage, Zheng He sailed from China in 1409, and carried with him the trilingual tablet which he planned to erect in Sri Lanka. The date equates to 15 February 1409, indicating that it was inscribed in Nanjing before the fleet set out. The Chinese portion gives praise to the Buddha and records lavish offerings in his honour.

The tablet was found by an engineer, S. H. Thomlin, in 1911 in Galle. It can now be seen in the Colombo National Museum. A modern replica of the stele has been installed in the Treasure Boat Shipyard Park in Nanjing, along with copies of other steles associated with the voyages of Zheng He.

== Discovery ==
The tablet was discovered in early 1911 during Public Works Department excavations to lay water mains near Cripps Road in northern Galle, Sri Lanka. It was found face down, being used as a cover stone for a culvert. British Provincial Engineer H. F. Tomalin oversaw its removal to the Public Works yard in Galle, and it was soon transferred to the Colombo National Museum. The inscriptions initially proved difficult to decipher because of its weathered surface, but photographs were taken by Andreas Nell and sent to experts in Britain and China. The discovery was first reported by G. A. Joseph at the annual general meeting of the Ceylon Branch of the Royal Asiatic Society in March 1911, describing it as "the oldest "foreign" lithic record yet found in Ceylon". Further analysis was published in Spolia Zeylanica (1913) by E. W. Perera and in Epigraphia Zeylanica (1928–1933) by Senarath Paranavitana.

== Offerings ==
1,000 pieces of gold; 5,000 pieces of silver; 50 rolls of embroidered silk in many colours; 50 rolls of silk taffeta, in many colours; 4 pairs of jewelled banners, gold embroidered and of variegated silk, 2 pairs of the same picked in red, one pair of the same in yellow, one pair in black; 5 antique brass incense burners; 5 pairs of antique brass flower vases picked in gold on lacquer, with gold stands; 5 yellow brass lamps picked in gold on lacquer with gold stands; 5 incense vessels in vermilion red, gold picked on lacquer, with gold stands; 6 pairs of golden lotus flowers; 2,500 catties of scented oil; 10 pairs of wax candles; 10 sticks of fragrant incense.

== Date ==
The date of 15 February 1409 on the Galle Trilingual Inscription possibly refers to when the trilingual inscription was erected in Galle, indicating that it was put up during the homeward journey of the second voyage. If not, the inscription could have been prepared in China and erected between 1410 when the fleet arrived at Galle to 1411 during the third voyage. J. J. L. Duyvendak (1939) states that the inscription must have been prepared in China on 15 February 1409 and erected during the third expedition (1409–1411), because he thinks that the 15 February 1409 date is connected to the dates for the conference of honors to two deities, Tianfei (天妃) on 21 January 1409 and Nanhaishen (南海神) on 15 February 1409.

== Bibliography ==
=== Original publications and translations ===
- "Note on an Inscribed Stone from Galle, ANNUAL GENERAL MEETING. Colombo Museum, March 30, 1911". The Journal of the Ceylon Branch of the Royal Asiatic Society of Great Britain & Ireland. 22 (64). Royal Asiatic Society of Sri Lanka (RASSL): 128–134. 1911. ISSN 0304-2235. JSTOR 43483639.
- Perera, E.W. (1912-13). The Galle Trilingual Stone. Spolia Zeylanica, Vol. VIII. The Colombo Museum
- Paranavitana, S. (1928–33). No. 36. The Tamil Inscription on the Galle Trilingual Slab, Epigraphia Zeylanica 3(35): 331–341.

=== Later research ===
- Chandima, A. and Wu, Y. (2011). A New Research on Galle Triangular Stele (Chinese). Dong Nan Wen Hua [Southeast Culture], (1):72–78.
- Devendra, S. (1990). The Galle Tri-Lingual Slab Inscription (editorial note). In Sri Lanka and the Silk Road of the Sea, edited by Senake Bandaranayake, Lorna Dewaraja, Roland Silva, and K.D.G. Wimalaratne, Colombo: The Sri Lanka National Commission for UNESCO and The Central Cultural Fund. pp. 217–219.
- Nagel, Eva (2001). The Chinese Inscription on the Trilingual Slabstone from Galle Reconsidered: A Case Study in Early Ming-China Diplomatics. In Ancient Ruhuna: Sri Lankan-German Archaeological Project in the Southern Province, Vol. 1, edited by H.–J. Weisshaar, H. Roth, and W. Wijeyapala, 385–468. Mainz: Verlag Philipp von Zabern.
- Ranasinghe, G. (2014). Trilingual Inscription of Galle and Tamil Maritime Trade Communities: Reveal from the Tamil Inscriptions Found in the East and Southeast Asia. Annual Research Symposium – 2014 – Symposium Proceedings; National Centre for Advanced Studies in Humanities and Social Sciences.
- Dewaraja, Lorna (2006). "Cheng Ho's Visits to Sri Lanka and the Galle Trilingual Inscription in the National Museum in Colombo". Journal of the Royal Asiatic Society of Sri Lanka. 52. Royal Asiatic Society of Sri Lanka (RASSL): 59–74. ISSN 1391-720X. JSTOR 23731298.
