= Munneswaram temple =

Hindu temple in Sri Lanka

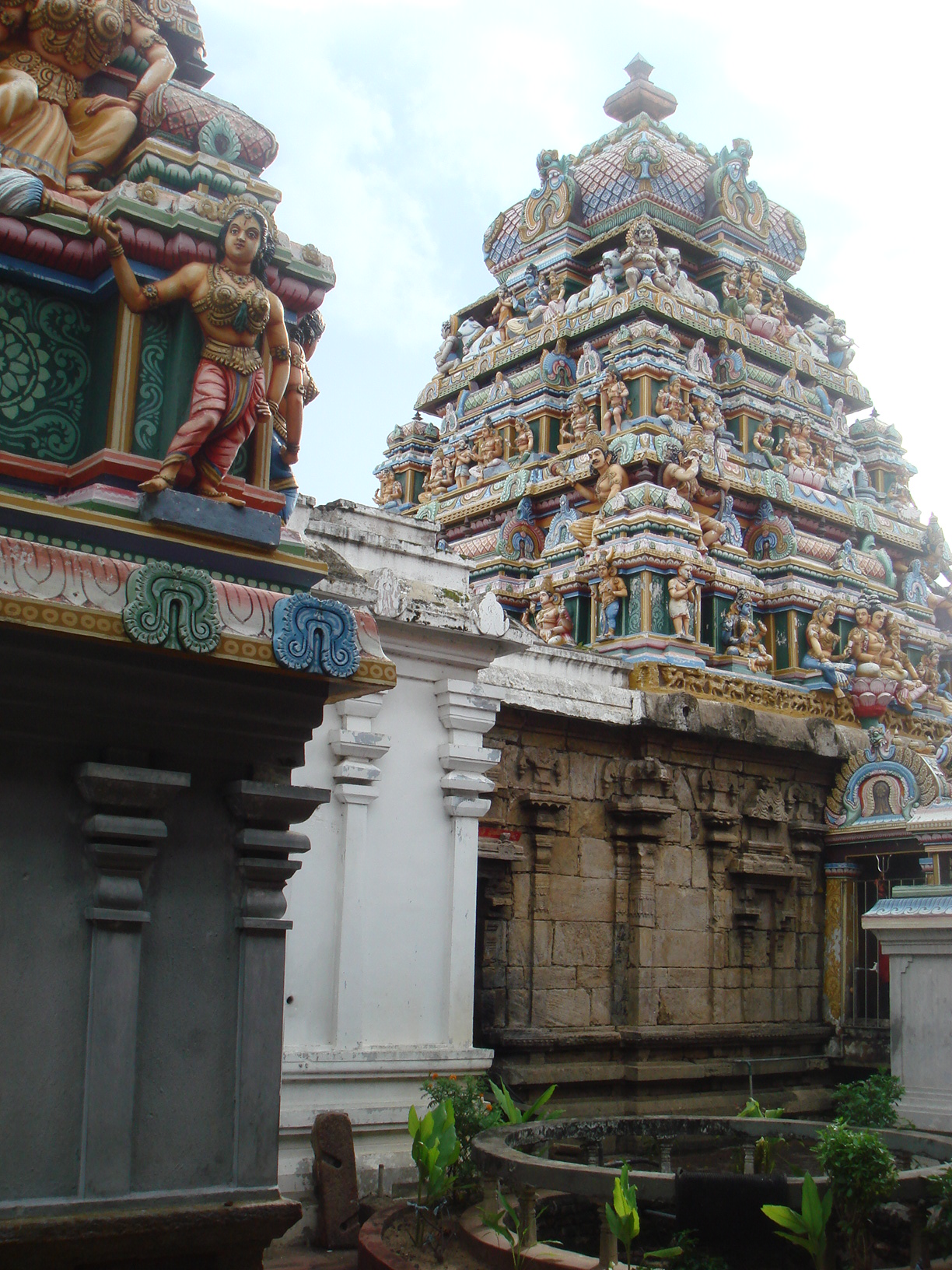
- Siva temple

- Location in Sri Lanka 200

Religion
- Affiliation: Hinduism
- District: Puttalam
- Province: North Western
- Deity: Shiva (Siva)

Location
- Location: Munneswaram, near Chilaw
- Country: Sri Lanka
- Interactive map of Munneswaram temple
- Coordinates: 7°34′50.80″N 79°49′00.02″E

Architecture
- Type: Dravidian architecture
- Established: Earliest date 1000 CE (probable)
- Completed: 1753

Munneswaram temple (Tamil: முன்னேசுவரம் கோயில், Sinhala: මුන්නේශ්වරම් කෝවිල) is an important regional Hindu temple complex in Sri Lanka. It has been in existence at least since 1000 CE although myths surrounding the temple associate it with the popular Indian epic Ramayana, and its legendary hero-king Rama. The temple is one of the ancient Pancha Ishwarams dedicated to Shiva in the region.

The temple complex is a collection of five temples, including a Buddhist temple. The central temple dedicated to Shiva (Siva) is the most prestigious and biggest, and is popular amongst Hindus. The other temples are dedicated to Ganesha, Aiyanar and Kali. The Kali temple is also popular with Buddhists, who frequent the complex. Post-19th century, most of the devotees of all temples in the complex belong to the majority Sinhala Buddhist ethnic group; the temples, excluding the Ayyanayake and the Buddhist temple, are administered by families belonging to the minority Hindu Tamils.

The temple is located in Munneswaram, a village with mixed Sinhala and Tamil population situated in the historic Demala Pattuva ("Tamil division") region in the Puttalam District. The main Shiva temple owns extensive property in the surrounding villages, ownership of which was affirmed when the region was part of the medieval Kotte Kingdom. The temple was destroyed twice by the Portuguese colonial officers, who handed over the properties to the Jesuits. Although the Jesuits built a Catholic chapel over the temple foundation, locals reconstructed the temple both times. Due to religious and demographic change after the late 18th century, most surrounding villages and towns are not directly associated with the temple administration and maintenance. However, the villages of Maradankulama and Udappu are associated with organizing the main temple festival.

The main festivals celebrated at the temple include Navarathri and Sivarathri. The former is a nine-day long festival in honour of the presiding Goddess, while the latter is an overnight observation in honour of Lord Shiva. In addition to these two Hindu festivals, the temple has a festival of its own, the Munneswaram festival, a four-week-long event attended by Hindus and Buddhists.

== History ==
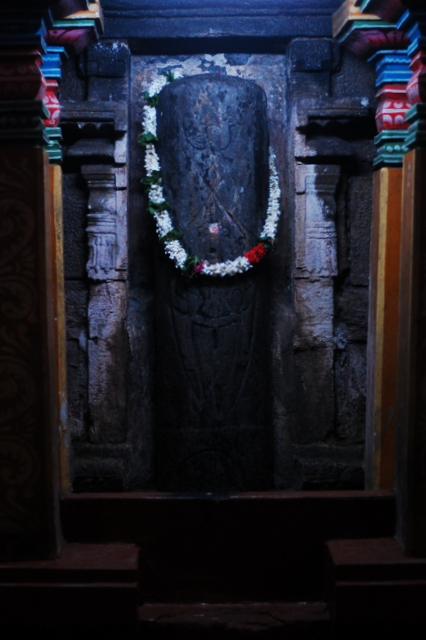
This Lingam is one of the few surviving idols from the days prior to the temple's destruction by the Portuguese.

Munneswaram temple is situated in Munneswaram village, the center of the spiritual and religious life of the people dwelling in a medieval administrative division called Munneswaram Pattuva ("Munneswaram division"). For most of the temple's existence, Munneswaram Pattuva has had over 60 villages for which Maradankulama provided political leadership. The Pattuva belonged to an even bigger medieval division called Demala Pattuva ruled by semi-independent Tamil chiefs subject to Sinhalese kingdoms. The presiding deity is called Sri Munnainathar ("Lord of antiquity" alluding to its ancient roots) and the goddess is called Sri Vativampika Devi ("goddess of beautiful form" another name for Mother goddess Ambal).

The temple has historically been associated with the nearby pearling and fishing town of Chilaw, as well as the landed gentry of the surrounding villages who provided the resources to maintain the temple. Proximity to the trading routes and to the port provided an opportunity for transmission of ideas and people from India to Sri Lanka. The Pattuva has many temples dedicated to the higher echelons of Hindu or Buddhist deities, and to village guardian deities such Ayyanar or Ayyanayake, Viramunda, Kadavara and Bandara. Anthropologist Rohan Bastin speculates that the main Siva temple was once a minor shrine dedicated to village guardian deity Munisvaran that was transformed into a major Siva temple due to royal patronage. The temple was already an established temple by the 11th century CE, as it had issued coins by then. The temple began under the patronage of Pattuva chiefs and was probably constructed during the early part of the 10th century CE. A ferry transported traders, pilgrims and chroniclers such as Ibn Battuta from Tenavaram temple, Tevan Thurai to the Chera and Chola kingdoms of Tamilakam, stopping at Puttalam of the Jaffna kingdom and sailing the Gulf of Mannar during the 14th century CE.

The Siva temple is historically attested in grants and in local literature. The Kali temple is a popular sorcery and cursing shrine associated with animal sacrifices and spirit possession. Spirit possession of devotees was noted by the Jesuit priests who left behind records of it in the 16th century. The temple dedicated to the Sinhala deity Ayyanayake (Aiyyanar to the Tamils) is administered by a local Sinhalese family. The Buddhist temple Pushparamaya Vihara is a post-19th century CE addition. The Ganesha temple, located to the south west of the main temple is the newest amongst the Hindu temples and was built during the early 19th century by artisans from South India.

Munneswaram, along with Koneswaram (Trincomalee), Naguleswaram (Keerimalai), Thiruketheeshwaram (Mannar), forms the five ancient temples (Ishwarams) dedicated to Shiva in the region including Sri Lanka.

=== Renovation and destruction ===
Renovation

The first known reconstruction of the temple was recorded in a grant made by Kotte Kingdom King Parakrakrama Bahu VI (1412/1415–1467). The grant was made in Grantha script in Sanskrit. In his thirty-eighth regnal year (1450 or 1453) he summoned the chief priest of the temple, Vijasamagava Panditha(r), and reaffirmed the lands that had belonged to the Siva temple. The villages mentioned as belonging to the temple are Ilupaideni(ya), Kottaipitti and Tittakatai. Revenue accrued from this land grant was exempt from tax. The grant was inscribed on a granite slab and installed as part of the renovated temple. The conquest of Jaffna kingdom by Sapumal Kumaraya, a military leader sent by the Kotte king in 1450, was celebrated in the Kokila Sandesaya ("Message carried by Kokila bird") written in the 15th century by the principal monk of the Irugalkula Tilaka Pirivena in Mulgirigala. The book contains a contemporary description of the country traversed by the road taken by the cookoo bird, from Tenavaram, Tevan Thurai (referred to as Devi Nuwara - "City of Gods") in the south to Nallur ("Beautiful City") in the North of Sri Lanka. It mentions the Munneswaram temple. The second set of grants to be recorded were by another Kotte King, Parakramabahu IX (1509–1528), who donated extensive lands to the temple and recorded the deed in a copper plate inscription.

Destruction

The Portuguese Empire, after its arrival in Sri Lanka in 1505, began a campaign of forced conversion and destruction of many Buddhist and Hindu temples around the island. They destroyed the Munneswaram temple completely in 1578 CE with the exception of the basement, and used the core of the building as a Roman Catholic chapel. Jesuits recorded that they used iron bars to destroy the presiding deity. According to a 1640 Portuguese records, they were able to convert 500 people from the village of Munneswaram as Roman Catholics. However, the locals and temple administrators were able to hide many of the idols of the temple complex before the destruction.

Reconstruction

Following the destruction, the Munneswaram Pattuva area came under the control of the expanding Kingdom of Sitawaka, led by its king Rajasinghe I (1581–1593), who continuously harassed the Portuguese during his reign. Rajasinghe I rebuilt the temple again, but due to continuous conflict most of the area around the temple was depopulated, and proper cultivation of lands abandoned. Irrigation tanks, which provided water for cultivation, fell into disuse. The Portuguese again destroyed the temple in the early 17th century, but the temple was rebuilt by the local people. It was nominally in usage when Kirti Sri Rajasinha (1747–1782) of the Kandyan Kingdom had the superstructure rebuilt in the 1750s. The Kalasam or Kotha on top was made of silver, a work of art displaying affinity to South India's Dravidian architecture. The kumbhabhishekham (consecration) ceremonies were performed in the year 1753, and for the performance of daily and special rites of the temple, Kirti Sri Rajasinghe made a grant of lands to the priests, recorded through a copper plate in 1753.

== Myths ==
Most of the myths associated with the temple are not dated and vary with the different religious and ethnic groups as well. One set of myths deals with the creation of the temple, and the other deals with various reconstruction efforts. For the Hindu Tamils, the Munneswaram temple is primarily a Siva temple. According to a Tamil legend, Sinhala Buddhists who hail from outside of Pattuva, Munneswaram is primarily a goddess temple, currently associated with Kali, and also a popular place of sorcery. Sinhalese myths say that Munneswaram is the place where the deity Kali landed from India. The legend further postulates that another Sinhalese female deity, Pattini, prevented Kali from devouring human beings and made her settle down in Munneswaram.

Another myth current amongst Tamils says that the temple was renovated by a legendary Chola king, Kullakotan. According to that myth, the king, who was afflicted with an incurable skin disease, was cured after taking a bath in the ruined temple's holy pond. Following the miracle, the king went on to renovate the temple and created a community of temple caretakers to maintain the temple. The equivalent myth amongst the Sinhalese people indicates that the diseased king was Rajasinghe or Bhuvanekabahu and the king prayed to the presiding goddess who cured him of his affliction. There were at least two kings called Rajasinghe in Sri Lanka, and both of them were involved in the actual renovations of the temple, and at least seven kings named Bhuvanekabahu, thereby making it difficult to identify the right king.

== Modern temple ==
It has been recorded that in 1830 the temple festival attracted thousands of people from the surrounding Pattuva, but by the 1870s the temple was abandoned again. One of the reasons was the depopulation of the Pattuva, due to various causes, and the conversion of paddy land into plantations from subsistence farming. By 1816, Munneswaram village had hardly 64 people, and the entire Munneswaram Pattuva had 1008 people in 63 villages.

The temple properties were no longer cultivated, and tanks were not maintained. Thus the population was surviving on slash and burn agriculture. British colonial policies favored the conversion of these lands into lucrative coconut plantations quickly covering all suitable Pattuva lands. Establishments of large-scale plantations also led to population increase due to migration and settlement of plantation workers from the interior of the country. This led to a demographic change, and the local Pattuva people became disassociated from the temple and its administration.

A few villagers from Munneswaram village filed a case in the Chilaw district courts to prevent the land grab of temple properties by outsiders. The case resulted in the British colonial government accepting temple properties as belonging to a newly created temple trust. The trust came under the control of one Cumaraswamy Kurukal from Colombo. His family maintains the hereditary priestly position of the Siva temple, and controls all temple properties. A Tamil family from Munneswaram village controls the priestly position of the Kali temple. The Siva temple was renovated in 1875 by the personal efforts of Cumaraswamy Kurukal. Improvements were effected again in 1919 and 1963 through public support from Tamil Hindus from Colombo and Jaffna. The temple has become very popular amongst the Sinhalese and they make up over 78% of the pilgrims to both the Siva and Kali temples.

== Temple layout ==
The presiding deity Siva is installed in the form of Lingam in the sanctum sanctorum. The Siva temple's architectural details conform to what is written down in the Hindu scriptures known as agamas. The Siva temple faces east and has three pathways around it. A sacred pond is situated in front of the Siva temple and a fig tree stands by the side of it. The main sanctum and the structure above the sanctum are one of the largest in Sri Lanka.

The Siva temple is surrounded by various other temples and shrines. To the southeast of the Siva Temple is a shrine dedicated to Ganesha. A temple dedicated to Ayyanayake, a Sinhalese Buddhist deity, is situated in the northeast corner of the third pathway of the Siva temple. The popular temple dedicated to Kali stands in the northern part of the pathway. In the southwest of the outer courtyard is another temple dedicated to Ganesha. Within the Siva temple there are shrines dedicated to the Navagraha (nine planets), the sixty three Saivite Nayanmar saints, various aspects of Siva, Ganesha and Amman.

== Center of Kali cult ==
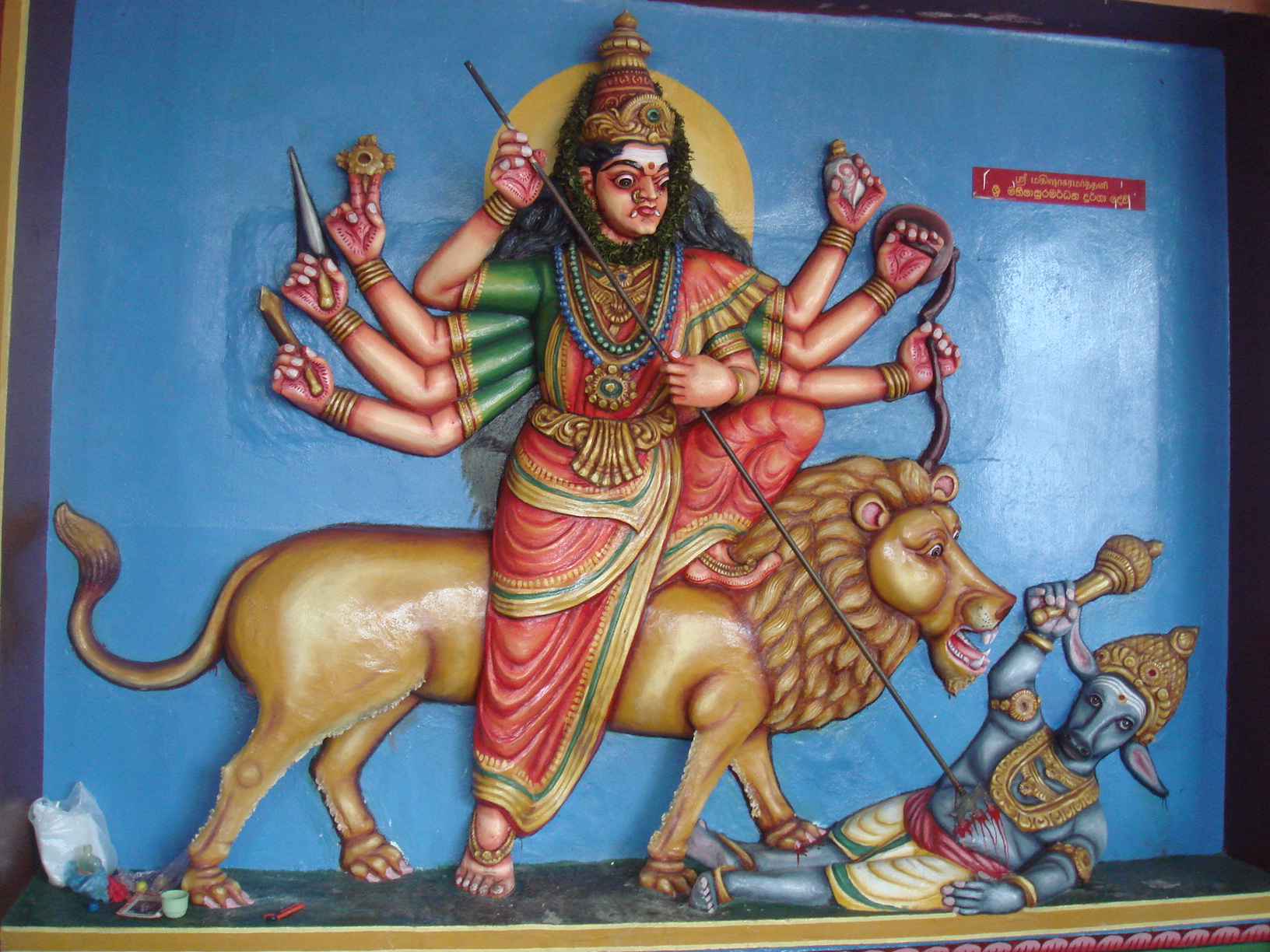
Panel View within the Munneswaram temple, depicting goddess Durga.

According to anthropologists Richard Gombrich and Gananath Obeyesekere, the cult of Kali reached Sri Lanka via South India. Although Kali shrines may have been part of Tamil Hindu temples prior to the 12th century CE, the Sinhalese Buddhist population came to revere Kali as a village demon at least by the 12th century CE. The first known Hindu temple with a shrine to Kali to become popular with the Sinhalese Buddhists is Munneswaram. A myth that has Kali landing at the town of Chilaw, and residing in Munneswaram, has made the temple a popular place of visit for cursing and sorcery purposes. In the early 1970s, the majority of the Sinhalese visitors were there for sorcery purposes, but by the 1990s more than half have been visiting the temple for general veneration purposes, demonstrating the transformation of the deity from a malevolent demigod to a mother goddess. The veneration of Kali has completely overtaken the previously popular veneration of Pattini. Since the 1960s a number of Sinhalese Buddhist shrines dedicated to Kali have sprung up all over the island, especially in urban areas. These are managed by Sinhalese priests who are trance specialists and act as intermediaries between the deity and the devotee while being possessed by the deity. The popular veneration of previously Hindu deities such as Kali and Kataragama deviyo (the latter identified with the Hindu Skanda) have fundamentally altered the rational nature of Theravada Buddhism towards the Bhakti ("Personal veneration of deity") aspect of Hinduism. Following protests by Buddhist monks and animal rights activist, the government banned the age old custom of animal sacrifices at the Kali temple in 2011.

== Festivals ==
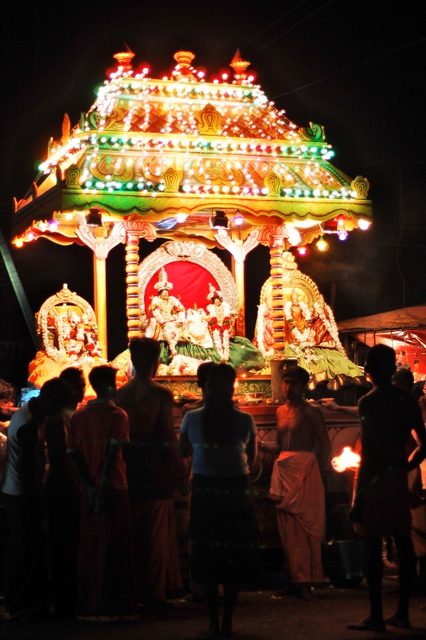
A chariot carrying images of the deities in procession, as part of the temple festivals.

The Munneswaram temple is well known for its celebration of Navaratri and Sivarathri functions. Navaratri lasts for nine days and is dedicated to various aspects of the presiding goddess, whereas Sivarathri is dedicated to Siva. Both these functions primarily attract Hindus to the temple. The annual Munneswaram festival is an important part of the temple calendar and it attracts Hindus, Buddhists, Catholics and even Muslims. Until the 1830s the festival lasted up to 18 days but since the 1960s it lasts for 28 days in the months of August and September. The festival begins with the hoisting of the temple flag. This is followed by 13 days of internal temple processions conducted in the outer pathways of the Siva temple. On each day of the festival, the images of Ganesha, Skanda, and the presiding consort goddess are paraded around the temple. Local Pattuva village deity temples also have festivals that coincide with the annual festival. Villagers belonging to Maradankulama and Uddappu sponsor a day each of the 28-day festival.

Devotees visit the temple to attend the daily pujas and make their offerings. Booths are erected outside for the sale of food, drink, brassware, pottery, cloth and holy images. On the penultimate day of the festival there is a procession, when the image of the goddess is placed upon a huge wooden chariot and pulled around the temple by devotees. On the final day of the festival, two large chariots are drawn by the devotees to the Deduru oya, a local river for the thirtham ("holy bath") ceremony when the images are dipped into the river. At the same time thousands of devotees also jump into the river. After the holy bath, the procession goes back to the temple along a route through Chilaw, accompanied by traditional Nadeswaram and Thavil musicians. The procession then passes the Ayyanayake and Kali temples prior to entering the main temple.

== See also ==
- Hinduism in Sri Lanka
