= Kovil =

Tamil term for Hindu temple

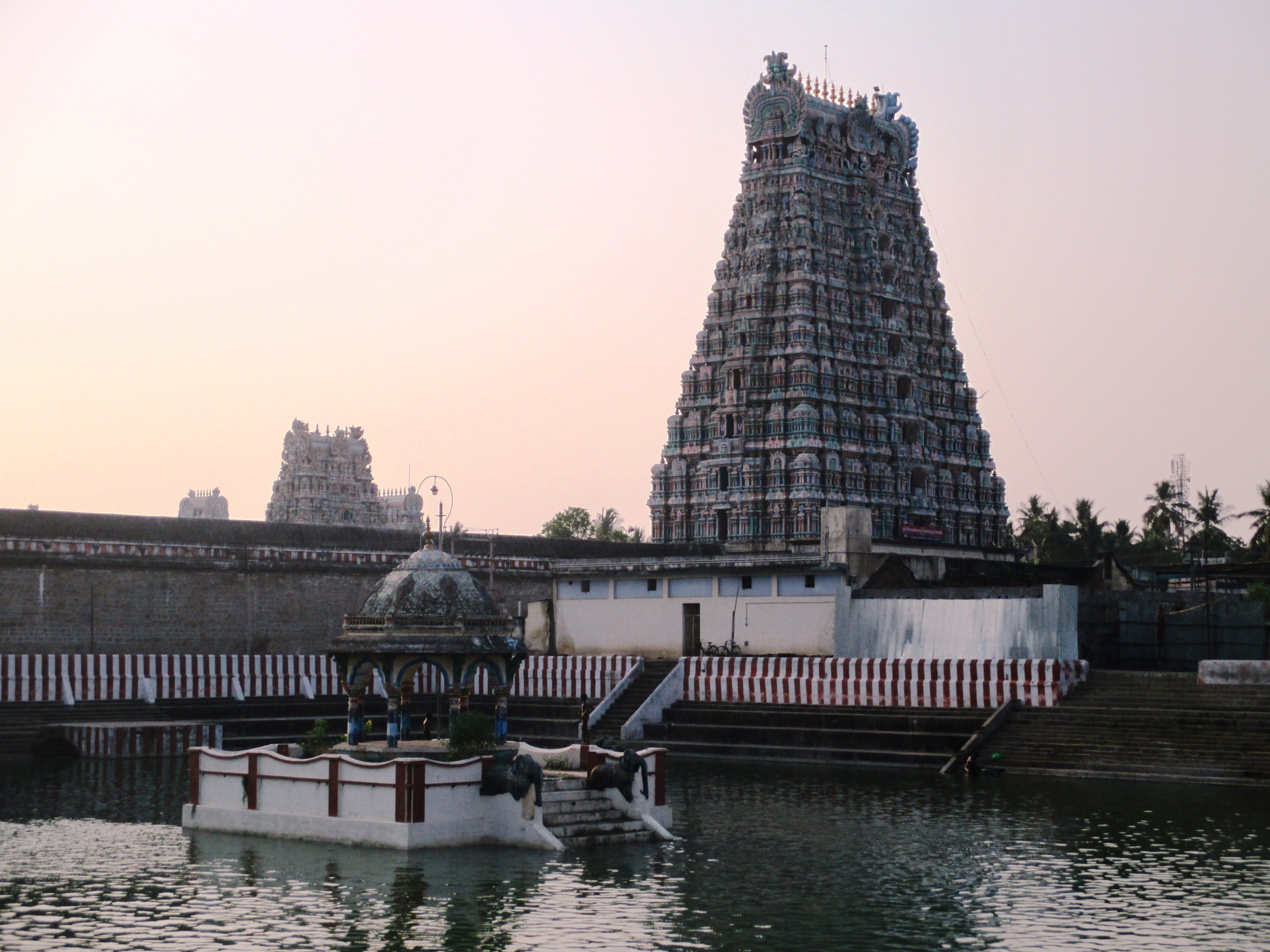
The Sri Vidhya Rajagopalaswamy Temple Hindu temple in the Town of Mannargudi in southern India

Kovil or koyil (meaning: residence of god) (Note: The modern Tamil word for Hindu temple is kōvil (Tamil: கோவில்) meaning "the residence of God". In ancient Tamil Nadu, the king (கோ, Kō) was considered to be a ‘representative of God on earth' and lived in a kōvil, which also means "king’s house". Old words for king like Kō (கோ "King"), Iṟai (இறை "Emperor") and Āṇṭavan (ஆண்டவன் "Conqueror") are now primarily used to refer to God.) is the Tamil term for a distinct style of Hindu temple with Dravidian architecture.

== Etymology ==
Both the terms koyil (கோயில், kōyil) and kovil (கோவில், kōvil) are used interchangeably. In Tamil, kōvil (wikt:ta:கோவில்) is the word derived, according to the rules of Tamil grammar. (Note: "உடம்படுமெய்ப் புணர்ச்சி" என்ற தமிழ் இலக்கண விதிப்படி, "வ்" வரும், கோ + இல் = கோவில். உடம்படு மெய்: நிலைமொழியில் இ, ஈ, ஐ, இருந்தால் "ய்" யும்; ஏனைய உயிர்கள் (அ, ஆ, உ, ஊ, ஓ) இருந்தால் "வ்"வும்; "ஏ' இருந்தால் இரண்டும் (ஏதாவது ஒன்று) உடம்படு மெய்யாக வரும்.)

== Description ==
In contemporary Tamil, the term 'kōvil' is also used to refer to "Place of Worship". In modern formal speech, kōvil is also referred to as aalayam, dheva sthaanam by many Hindus. Ambalam is another term used by devotees of the 19th century Tamil monk Vallalar. Another term is 'Thali' (தளி), which also means temple.

For Vaishnavites the foremost kōvils are, Sri Ranganathaswamy temple, Srirangam and Tirumala Venkateswara temple, Tirupati are viewed as important While for Shaivites, the foremost kōvils are Chidambaram temple and Koneswaram temple are important.

In Tamil Nadu, India, the term "kovil" is commonly used to refer to the famous Hindu temples in the region, such as The Parthasarathy Temple, Chennai, the Brihadeeswarar Temple in Thanjavur, and the Narasimhaswamy Temple, Namakkal are important cultural and religious landmarks, and attract thousands of visitors each year.

There are over 36,488 Temples in Tamil Nadu alone as registered by Hindu Religious and Charitable Endowments Department. The Sangam literature scripted before the common era, refers to some of the temples the early kings of Tamilagam had erected. The songs of the revered Vaishnava Alvar saints that date back to the period 5th to the 10th century CE and the Shaiva Nayanars that date back to the period 7th to the 10th century CE provide ample references to the temples of that period. Stone inscriptions found in most temples describe the patronage extended to them by the various rulers.

The most ancient temples were built of wood as well as brick and mortar. Up to about 700 CE temples were mostly of the rock-cut type. The Pallava kings were great builders of temples in stone. The Chola dynasty (850–1279 CE) left a number of monuments to their credit such as the Brihadeeswarar Temple in Thanjavur. The Cholas added many ornate mandpams or halls to temples and constructed large towers. The Pandya style (until 1350 CE) saw the emergence of huge towers, high wall enclosures and enormous towered gateways (Gopurams). The Vijayanagara Style (1350–1560 CE) is famous for the intricacy and beauty especially for the decorated monolithic pillars. The Nayak style (1600–1750 CE) is noted for the addition of large prakaram (outer courtyard) (circum-ambulatory paths) and pillared halls.

== See also ==
- Dravidian architecture
- Architecture of Tamil Nadu
- Hindu temple § South Indian and Sri Lankan temples
