= Munneswaram (village) =

Munneswaram මුන්නේෂ්වරම
- Village
- Location within Sri Lanka
- Coordinates: 7°34′50.80″N 79°49′00.02″E
- Country: Sri Lanka
- Province: Northwestern Province
- District: Puttalam District
- Time zone: +5.30

Munneswaram or Munnessarama (Sinhala: මුන්නේෂ්වරම) is a village in the Puttalam District of Sri Lanka. It is known for its Munneswaram temple.

== See also ==
- Munneswaram temple
- Puttalam District
- Chillaw
