= Sri Lankan Tamil literature =

Sri Lankan Tamil literature or Ceylon Tamil literature refers to Tamil literature produced in the current day country of Sri Lanka by various Tamil speaking communities such as the Sri Lankan Tamils, Indian Tamils of Sri Lanka and Sri Lankan Muslims. The earliest extant records survived from the Sangam age academies and continued in the medieval era in the courts of the Jaffna kingdom until modern times. The destruction of the Saraswathy Mahal library of Nallur and the burning of Jaffna library led to the loss of a large tract of Sri Lankan Tamil literature, although much survives through oral traditions and the unearthing and preservation of palm-leaf manuscripts, copper plate inscriptions and stone inscriptions .

== Classical era ==
The earliest extant Sri Lankan Tamil literature survives from the academies of the Sangam age dated from 200 BCE. Īḻattup pūtaṉtēvaṉār was one of the earliest known native classical Eelam Tamil poets from the Sangam period, hailing from Manthai, Mannar District, Sri Lanka. Included in the Tamil language anthologies of the Sangam literature compiled in Tamilakam before 250 CE his poems, written in the city of Madurai, praise the valour of the contemporaneous King Pasum Poon Pandyan, who, as per the Narkudi Velalar Varalaru, reigned from 275 - 240 BCE. Seven of his poetic verses feature in the Akananuṟu, Natriṇai and Kurunthokai and also concern the landscape and governance.

Other ancient native Sri Lankan Tamil poets whose work feature in the anthologies of South India include Mudingarayar, Musiri Asiriyar, Neelakandanar, Nannaganar, Pūtan Ila Naganar and Marudan Ila Naganar. Most of these poets were of the Naga tribe of Mantai and Jaffna. One of the latter poets may have been Ilanaga of Anuradhapura, who was at one point exiled in South India from where he recruited Tamil soldiers.

Verses in praise of Hindu deities were written in Hindu temples built by the Chola Empire circa 11th century.

== Medieval phase ==
The medieval phase Thamizh literature was produced in the courts of the native Yazhppanam kingdom. During the reign of Jeyaveera Cinkaiariyan, a writing on medical sciences (Segarajasekaram), astrology (Segarajasekaramalai) and mathematics (Kanakathikaram) were authored by Karivaiya. During the rule of Gunaveera Cinkaiariyan, a work on medicine known as Pararajasekaram was completed. During Singai Pararasasekaran's rule, an academy for the propagation of Thamizh language on the model of ancient Thamizh Sangam's was established in Nallur. This academy performed a useful service in collecting and preserving ancient works in the form of manuscripts in a library called Saraswathy Mahal. Singai Pararasasekaran's cousin Arasakesari is credited with translating the Sanskrit classic Raghuvamsa into Tamil. Among other literary works of historic importance compiled before the arrival of European colonizers, Vaiyapatal, written by Vaiyapuri Aiyar, is well known. The Konesar Kalvettu and Mattakallappu Manmiyam concern religion, governance and origin records of the cities of Trincomalee and Batticaloa and such Thamizh literature of the period was influential on other languages; the Koneswaram temple's traditional history and legends were compiled into the Sanskrit treatises Dakshina Kailasa Puranam – Sthala Puranam of Koneswaram, written in 1380 by Jeyaveera Cinkaiariyan, and the Dakshina Kailasa Manmiam had three chapters included in the Skanda Puranam of unknown antiquity – manuscripts of which have been discovered and dated from the 5th – 7th century.

== Colonial phase ==
Portuguese and the Dutch colonial periods (1619–1796) brought its own local literary responses; Muttukumara Kavirajar (1780–1851) is the earliest known among those who used literature to respond to Christian missionary activities. This was followed by the literary activities of Arumuga Navalar (1822–1879) who wrote and published a number of books. Mayilvagana Pulavar, wrote the book Yazhppana Vaipava Malai in 1736, containing facts of the early Thamizh city of Yazhppanam. The period of joint missionary activities by the Anglican, American Ceylon and Methodist Missions saw the spread of modern education and the expansion of translation activities which concluded by the close of the 19th century.

== Modern phase ==
The modern phase of literature started in the 1960s with the establishment of modern universities and a free education system in the post-independence Sri Lanka. Three important personalities surfaced during this time in the Sri Lankan Tamil literary world. These poets became famous not only in Sri Lanka but also worldwide wherever Tamil speaking live. They were : Maha Kavi (North Sri Lanka), Neelaavanan (East Sri Lanka), Murugayyan (North Sri Lanka). Their literary works are available in various sources including digital and printed media.

The 1960s also saw a social revolt against the caste system in Jaffna which affected Tamil literature. Dominic Jeeva was a product of this period. Tamil literature was comparatively ahead of its mainland counterpart in modern Tamil Nadu with respect to Dalit issues. After the commencement of the civil war in 1983, a number of poets and fiction writers became active, focussing on issues such as death, destruction and rape. Such writings have no parallels in any previous Tamil literature. The war produced writers from across the globe who reminisced their longing for their lost homes as well as a need for integration with mainstream communities in Europe and North America. In 21st-century contemporary literature, writers such as Rani Seetharan have focused on post-war socio-cultural dynamics, women's psychological resilience, and mental well-being through fiction and essay collections. Sri Lankan Tamils have produced a number of plays during the modern period in what may be considered a catalyst towards cinema.
