= List of suicides of Sri Lankan Tamil asylum seekers in Australia =

Several Sri Lankan Tamil asylum seekers in Australia have died by suicide amid challenges faced while navigating the country's immigration system. Originating from Sri Lanka, where decades of ethnic conflict and persecution have compelled many Tamils to seek refuge abroad, these individuals experienced prolonged visa uncertainty, mental health challenges, and the effects of detention. These cases highlight issues within Australia's asylum policies and the conditions faced by Sri Lankan Tamil asylum seekers.

== History of displacement ==
The Sri Lankan Tamil asylum seekers' journey to Australia is deeply rooted in a long history of displacement and struggle. The Tamil people, originally from the northern and eastern regions of Sri Lanka, had their own kingdom in Jaffna until it was annexed by colonial powers, beginning with the Portuguese in the early 17th century. The destruction of their temples and cultural heritage continued under successive colonial rule by the Dutch and the British.

== Post-colonial challenges and asylum seeking ==
In the post-independence era, ethnic tensions escalated as discriminatory policies marginalised Tamils, leading to the Sri Lankan Civil War (1983–2009). The war resulted in mass displacement, loss of life, and widespread human rights abuses against the Tamil population. Even after the war ended, continued persecution, lack of basic rights, and fear of violence prompted many Tamils to seek refuge abroad, including in Australia, where the asylum process posed additional challenges.

== List of suicides ==
The following is a list of Sri Lankan Tamil asylum seekers in Australia who have died by suicide due to various factors such as mental health deterioration, prolonged detention, and uncertainty about their asylum status:

Name	Date of death	Notes
Unnamed Tamil asylum seeker	5 January 2013	Lived in Fremantle, Western Australia. Experienced deteriorating mental health due to detention and asylum status uncertainty.
Leo Seemanpillai	31 May 2014	Self-immolated in Geelong, Victoria, fearing deportation back to Sri Lanka.
Janarthanan	2016	Limited information, but reportedly faced prolonged visa limbo.
Unnamed 45-year-old Tamil asylum seeker	August 2018	Died in a Brisbane hospital after a suicide attempt following asylum application rejection.
Sasikaran Selvanayagam	August 2023	Struggled with uncertainty over visa status.
Mano Yogalingam	28 August 2023	Self-immolated after 12 years on a bridging visa; died in a Melbourne hospital. Protested visa limbo.

== Discrimination in Australia ==
In Australia, Sri Lankan Tamil asylum seekers have faced significant discrimination and systemic challenges. Many have endured prolonged periods on temporary or bridging visas, leaving them in a state of uncertainty and unable to build stable lives. These asylum seekers often encounter restrictions on work, travel, and access to essential services, contributing to a sense of alienation and mental distress. The Australian Government's "fast-track" visa processing system has left many in limbo, with some waiting for over a decade to know their fate. Fear of deportation, limited access to mental health support, and an uncertain future have led to severe mental health crises, resulting in tragic outcomes, including suicides. The asylum seekers' experiences reflect not only the ongoing consequences of the conflict in Sri Lanka but also the challenges of navigating an often hostile immigration system.

== Reactions and aftermath ==
The deaths of Sri Lankan Tamil asylum seekers in Australia have sparked significant distress and reactions from their families and the broader community. Following the death of Leo Seemanpillai, his family in India faced additional hardship. Seemanpillai's father expressed his frustration over the lack of support from the Australian Government: "They [the Australian government] have said they will not take responsibility for anything. We will not be able to send the body to Sri Lanka, or India, and we will not be able to come to Australia." This inability to participate in the funeral and obtain closure added to the family's grief.

Other Tamil asylum seekers have continued to face difficulties, including prolonged visa processing times, limited access to employment, and inadequate mental health support. These challenges have drawn criticism toward Australia's asylum policies, highlighting the mental health and humanitarian issues faced by those caught in uncertain and restrictive immigration conditions.

The reactions to these events have intensified calls for policy changes and the provision of permanent residency to those who have been waiting in limbo for years. Advocacy groups and community members continue to highlight the urgent need for mental health support and a more humane asylum-seeking process in Australia.

== See also ==
- Tamil Case – family reunification scandal of Tamil refugees in Denmark
- List of Sri Lankan Tamil temples destroyed during colonial rule – Details of Tamil temples destroyed by Portuguese, Dutch, and British
- Sri Lankan Civil War
