= Dominic Jeeva =

Sri Lankan activist (1927–2021)

- Born: 27 June 1927; Ceylon
- Died: 28 January 2021 (aged 93)
- Occupation: Author
- Writing career
- Genre: Short Story

Dominic Jeeva Tamil: டொமினிக் ஜீவா; 27 June 1927 – 28 January 2021) was a Sri Lankan Tamil author. Jeeva was for a period of time forgotten as a writer. He first became known to non-Tamil speaking readers after a review of his short story collection Pathukai.

== Early life ==
Jeeva began as a barber in Jaffna, Sri Lanka. At that time, he was fascinated by Mahatma Gandhi, and the policies of Indian Congress Party. During this period he became acquainted with Tampo Rajagopal, who inspired him to read books, taught him to write and introduced him to other writers such as S. Ponnumdurai (author of the novel Sadangu). Later, Jeeva leaned towards Communist party ideals and spoke in trade union meetings. He wrote his first story while working at the barber saloon. He stated that the "barber shop is his university" and often praised Rajagopal as his mentor.

== Career ==
Though without an academic background, Jeeva became one of the most prominent writers in the Tamil world. He was the editor of Mallikai, a monthly journal on literature for more than four decades. The term 'progressive writing' was a euphemism for those with Communist leaning in the 1960s and 1970s. In their writings, these progressive writers attacked vehemently the linguistic jingoism of writers belonging to the Dravidian school. Mallikai promoted Moscow-based Communist writers during the Soviet era. In the 1960s Jeeva received a Sri Lanka Sahithya Academy Award.

Jeeva was the author and publisher of many books and short stories. Jeeva established a publishing center called Mallikai Panthal.

He died on 28 January 2021, aged 93.

== Bibliography ==
=== Books ===
- Thanneerum Kanneerum
- Pathukai
- Saalayin Thiruppam
- Vazhvin Tharisanangal
- Dominic Jeeva Sirukathaikal

=== Essays ===
- Anubava Muththiraigal
- Thalaippookkal
- Eazhalaththilirunthu Oru Illakkiyakural
- Thoondil
- Munnuraigal
- Mupperim Thalainagarangalil 30 Natkal

=== Biography ===
- Ezhuthappadatha Kavithaikku Varaiyappadatha Siththiram

=== Other books ===
- Emathu Ninaivugalil Kailasapathy
- Malligai Mugangal
- Attaippada Oviyangal
- Tamil translation of 15 Sinhala stories

== Awards ==
- 1961 - Sri Lanka Sahithya Academy Award Thaneerum Kanneerum
- 1963 - Sri Lanka Sahitiya Academy Award Pathukai
- 2001 - M.A.(Hons) - University of Jaffna

== See also ==
- List of Tamils of Sri Lanka
- Tamil language
- Tamil literature
