= Muttukumara Kavirajar =

Muttukumara Kavirajar (1780–1851), the Ceylon / Sri Lankan Tamil poet, was one of the earliest Hindus to protest via published native literature the conversion attempts by the various Protestant missionaries within the Jaffna Peninsula in Sri Lanka. He wrote the Jnanakkummi or Kummi Song on Wisdom and Yesumataparikaram or Abolition of the Jesus Doctrine. These poem were initially published in 1850s by Arumuga Navalar
