= Eelam =

Native Tamil name for Sri Lanka

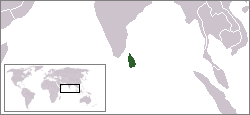
Location of Eelam, the Tamil name for Sri Lanka

Eelam (Tamil: ஈழம், īḻam, Tamil: [iːɻɐm], also spelled Eezham, Ilam or Izham in English) is the native Tamil name for the South Asian island also known as Sri Lanka. Eelam is also the Tamil name for the spurge (a plant), toddy (an intoxicant) and gold.

The exact etymology and the original meaning of the word are not clearly known, and there are number of conflicting theories. The retroflex approximant ḻ in īḻam is a characteristic phoneme for Dravidian languages that is now retained only in the closely related languages Tamil and Malayalam. Conventionally, it has been represented in the Latin script by the digraph zh.

== History ==
The earliest use of the word is found in a Tamil-Brahmi inscription as well as in the Sangam literature. The Tirupparankunram inscription found near Madurai in Tamil Nadu and dated on palaeographical grounds to the 1st century BCE, refers to a person as a householder from Eelam (Eela-kudumpikan). The inscription reads,

: erukatur eelakutumpikan polalaiyan "Polalaiyan, (resident of) Erukatur, the husbandman (householder) from Eelam."

The Sangam literature Paṭṭiṉappālai, mentions Eelattu-unavu (food from Eelam). One of the prominent Sangam Tamil poets is known as Eelattu Poothanthevanar meaning Poothan-thevan (proper name) hailing from Eelam. (Akanaṉūṟu: 88, 231, 307; Kuṟuntokai: 189, 360, 343; Naṟṟiṇai: 88, 366). The Tamil inscriptions from the Pallava and Chola period dating from 9th century CE link the word with toddy, toddy tapper's quarters (Eelat-cheri), tax on toddy tapping (Eelap-poodchi), a class of toddy tappers (Eelath-chanran). Eelavar is a caste of toddy tappers found in the southern parts of Kerala. Eela-kaasu and Eela-karung-kaasu are refers to coinages found in the Chola inscriptions of Parantaka I.

Since the 1980s the words Eelam and Eelavar have been taken up by the Tamil separatist movements spearheaded by the Tamil Tigers. Eelavar now refers to the citizens of the proposed Tamil Eelam, which would have taken up the northern and eastern parts of Sri Lanka.

== Etymology ==
=== Sihala>Eelam ===
Late-19th-century linguists took the view that the name Eelam was derived from the Pali (An Indo-Aryan language) form Sihala for Sri Lanka. Robert Caldwell, following Hermann Gundert, cites the word as an example of the omission of initial sibilants in the adoption of Indo-Aryan words into Dravidian languages. Sri Lankan historian Karthigesu Indrapala in his thesis released in 1965 suggested that the people from whose named Eelam is derived were Sinhalese. The earliest occurrence of the name Eelam is in the Brahmi inscriptions of South India in which it occurs as Ila (Eela), the Prakrit form of the Eelam. He derived Eelam from Sinhala as follows;

Sinhaḷa>Sîhaḷa (in Pali) / Sihiḷa (in Prakrit)>Sîḷa>Iḷa>Iḻam (Eelam).

=== Eelam>Sihala ===
Thomas Burrow, in contrast, argued that the word was likely to have been Dravidian in origin, on the basis that Tamil and Malayalam hardly ever substitute 'ɻ', a peculiarly Dravidian sound, for the Sanskrit -'l'-. He suggested that the name "Eelam" came from the Dravidian word "Eelam" (or Cilam) meaning "toddy", referring to the palm trees in Sri Lanka, what was later absorbed into Indo-Aryan languages. He thought that was also likely to have been the source for the Pali '"Sihala". The Dravidian Etymological Dictionary, which was jointly edited by Thomas Burrow and Murray Emeneau, marks the Indo-Aryan etymology with a question mark.

Karthigesu Indrapala updated his theory in 2005 and claims that Eela, the stem of Eelam, is attested in Sri Lanka for centuries before the common era as a name of an ethnic group and that it eventually came to be applied to the island as Eelam. He also believes that the name of the island was applied to the popular coconut tree or vice versa in Tamil. He believes the early native names for the present Sinhalese ethnic group, such as Hela, are derivations of Eela, which was Prakritized as Sihala and eventually Sanskritized as Simhala in the 5th century CE.

Iḷa (Eela)>Sihaḷa>Simhaḷa.

=== Other theories ===
Peter Schalk, a professor of theology from University of Uppsala, concludes that it is a proper Dravidian word used exclusively for toddy beginning from the common era up until the medieval period.

Another theory based on archeological evidence suggests the word is a Tamil word which originated from South India. Also the Tamil meaning of "Eelam" is postulated to be homeland.

The Tamil lexicons Thivaakaram, Pingkalam and Choodaama'ni, dating from c. 8th century CE, equate the word Eezham with Chingka'lam (the Sinhala country).

== Cognate terms ==
=== Ancient ethnic group ===
Eela and Eelavar are etymologically related to Eelam. The stem Eela is found in Prakrit inscriptions dated to 2nd century BCE in Sri Lanka in terms such as Eela-Barata and Eela-Naga, proper names. The meaning of Eela in these inscriptions is unknown although one could deduce that they are either from Eela, a geographic location, or were an ethnic group known as Eela.

=== South Indian caste theory ===
Eelavar in South Indian medieval inscriptions refer to the caste or function of toddy-drawers, drawn from the Dravidian word for palm tree toddy, Eelam. From the 19th century onwards, sources appeared in South India regarding a legendary origin for caste of toddy drawers known as Eelavar in the state of Kerala. These theories stated that Eelavar were originally from Eelam. The consciousness of the South Indian Eelavar caste being of Sri Lankan origin is not older than 150–200 years.
