= Eelattu Poothanthevanar =

Personal details
- Born: 300 BCE - 300 CE Mantai, Mannar, Northern Province, Sri Lanka
- Occupation: Poet

Eelattu Poothanthevanar was one of the earliest known classical Ceylon (present day Sri Lanka) Tamil poets from the Sangam period. He hailed from the ancient international port of Manthai (Manthottam/ Manthoddam in Tamil, derived from Sinhalese māthota which means the great port) Ceylon, the ruins of which are in present-day Mannar District, Sri Lanka. His poems were included in the Tamil language anthologies of the Sangam literature compiled in Tamilakam before 250 CE. Writing in the city of Madurai, he praises the valour of the contemporaneous King Pasum Poon Pandyan, who, as per the Narkudi Velalar Varalaru, reigned from 275 to 240 BCE. Seven of his poetic verses feature in the Akananuṟu, Natriṇai and Kurunthokai.

Other Sri Lankan Tamil poets whose contemporary work feature in the anthologies include Pūtan Ila Naganar and Marudan Ila Naganar.

== Contribution to the Sangam literature ==
Eelattu Poothanthevanar wrote two Sangam verses, including one each in Akananuru (verse 88) and Kurunthogai (verse 343).

== See also ==
- List of Sangam poets
- Sri Lankan Tamil literature
- Sangam literature
