= Narkudi Velalar Varalaru =

Narkudi Velalar Varalaru is a book consisting of 1,035 Tamil poems by Arumuga Nayinar Pillai. It was published in 1920 by Sri S. Vala Subramaniya Pillai of Sivakalai. The book narrates the history of the Irungovel family, a branch of Pandya rulers who reigned for 201 generations from 3100 BCE to 1944 AD.

Additional notes about this book was conducted by Sri R. Vaiyaapuri, M.A. and Santhalinga Adikalar, College of Tamil, Perur.

== Pandyan Dynasty ==
- Kadun Kone
- Pandyan Palsalai Muthukudumi Peruvazhuthi (66th generation) 500-450 BC
- Karungai Ollvat Perum Peyar vazhuthi (67th generation) 450 BC to 400 BC
- Porval Vazhuthi (68th generation) 400 BC to 380 BC
- Korkai Vazhuthi-Nartrer Vazhuthi (69th generation) 380-340 BC
- Deva Pandian (70th generation) 340-302 BC
- Seya Punjan aliasKadalul maintha Ilamperuvazhuthi (71st) 302 BC-270 BC
- Pasum Poon Pandyan (72nd generation) 270-245 BC
- Ollaiyur thantha Boothapandian (73rd generation) 245-220 BC
- Pandyan Nanmaran (74th generation) 220 BC-200 BC
- Nedunchezhian alias Kadalan vazhithi (75th generation) 200-180 BC
- Marungai Vazhuthi (76th generation) 180 BC-160 BC
- Pandyan Uthaman alias Puliman vazhuthi (77th) 160-150 BC
- Pandyan Keeran Sathan (78th generation) 150 BC-140 BC
- Kaliman Vazhuthi alias Andar magan Kuruvazhuthi (79th) 140-120 BC
- Pandyan Yenathi @Nedunkannan (80th) 120-100 BC
- Korkai Vazhuthi@ Irandam Pasum Poon Pandyan (81st) 100-87 BC
- Deva Pootanan@ Ilavanthikai palli tunjiya Nanmaran (82nd) 87-62 BC
- Thalayanankanathu Cheru Vendra Nedunchezhian (83rd) 62-42 BC
- Kanapereyil kadantha Ukkira Peruvazhuthi (84th) 42 BC-1 AD
- Pandyan Arivudainambi (Purananooru 184) (85th) 1-30 AD
- Velliyambalathu tunjiya PeruVazhuthi (86th) 30-60 AD
- Ariyapadai Kadantha Nedunchezhian (87th) 60-117 AD
- Vetriver Chezhian (88th generation) 117-160 AD
- Nedunchezhian II (89th generation) 160-198 AD
- Ukkira Maran@ Chitramadathu tunjiya Nanmaran (90th) 198-220 AD
- Pannadu thantha Maran Vazhuthi (91st) 220-250 AD
- Koddakarathu tunjiya Maranvazhuthi (92nd) 250-270 AD
- Thennavan Ko (93rd generation) 270-297 AD
- Parakirama Bahu @ Nalvazhuthi (94th generation 298-310 AD
- Kaliyan Koothan (95th generation)
- Kadalan Vazhuthi (of Kazhugumalai inscriptions) (96th generation)
- Porkai Pandyan (98th generation)
- Pandyan Kadunkhon (103rd generation) 475-490 AD
- Ukkira Pandyan (103rd generation) -498 AD
- Somasundara Pandyan (105th generation) 498-540 AD

== Unity treaty ==
Imayavaramban Neduncheralathan, Karungai Olvat Perumvazhuthi, and Deva Pandian (70th) signed a joint declaration of unity that lasted for 113 years. This treaty served to protect Tamil lands from northern invaders. During the final years of this pact (200 BC), the Chozha Emperor Karikalan II’s court poet, Mudathamakanniyar, wrote Porunaratrupadai [53-55]. She recorded the scene of three Tamil emperors sharing the same dais. Poet Kumattor Kannanar, who wrote the second ten in Pathitru Pathu, witnessed another historic meeting of these three Tamil emperors. Later in 42 BC, the poet Avvaiyar also witnessed three Tamil emperors together. This unity among Tamils did not last, however.

== Chera emperors ==
- Vanavan @ Vanavaramban (430-350 BC)
- Kuttuvan Uthiyan Cheralathan (350-328 BC) ruled for 22 years
- Imayavaramban Neduncheralathan (328-270 BC) ruled for 58 years
- Palyaanai Chelkezhu Kuttuvan (270-245 BC) ruled for 25 years
- Kalangaikanni narmudicheral (245-220 BC) ruled for 25 years
- Perumcheralathan (220-200 BC) ruled for 20 years
- Kudakko Neduncheralathan (200-180 BC) ruled for 20 years
- Kadal Pirakottiya Velkezhu kuttuvan (180-125 BC) ruled 55 years
- Adukotpattuch Cheralathan (125-87 BC) ruled 38 years
- Selvak kadungo Vazhiyathan (87-62 BC) ruled 25 years
- Yanaikatchei Mantharanj Cheral Irumborai (62-42 BC) ruled 20 years
- Thagadoor Erintha Perum Cheral Irumborai (42-25 BC) ruled 17 years
- Ilancheral Irumborai (25-19 BC) ruled 16 years
- Karuvur Eriya Koperumcheral Irumborai (9-1 BC)
- Vanji Mutrathu tunjiya Anthuvancheral (20 BC-10 AD)
- Kanaikal Irumborai (20-30 AD)
- Palai Padiya Perum kadungko (1-30 AD)
- Kokothai Marban (30-60 A.D)
- Cheran Chenguttuvan (60-140 AD)
- Kottambalathu tunjiya Maakothai (140-150 AD)
- Cheraman mudangi kidantha Nedumcheralathan (150-160 AD)
- Cheraman Kanaikkal Irumborai (160-180 AD)
- Cheraman Ilamkuttuvan (180-200 AD)
- Thambi Kuttuvan (200-220 AD)
- Poorikko (220-250 AD)
- Cheraman Kuttuvan Kothai (250-270 AD)
- Cheraman Vanjan (270-300 AD)
- Mantharanj Cheral (330-380 AD) found in Allahabad inscriptions of Samudragupta.

== Chozha emperors ==
- Karikalan I (450-380 BC)
- Cheraman Paamaloor erintha Neythalanganal Ilamchetchenni (380-320 BC)
- Cherupaazhi erintha Ilamchetchenni (320-270 BC)
- Perumpoon chenni (270-245 BC)
- Uruva Paikhrer Ilamchetchenni (245-232 BC)
- Karikalan II (232-200 BC)
- Manakkilli (200-180 BC)
- Vel pahradakkai Peruviral Killi (180-160 BC)
- Pooravaikopp Perunarkkilli (160-125 BC)
- Mudithalai Koperunarkkilli (125-87 BC)
- Koperum Chozhan (87-62 BC)
- Otrumai Vetta Perunarkkilli (62-40 BC)
- Chetchenni Nalankilli @ Maavalathan (40-22 BC)
- Kulamutrathu tunjiya Killivalavan (22 BC-1 AD)
- Kurapalli tunjiya Perum Thirumavalavan (1-40 AD)
- Neythalankanal Ilamchetchenni (40-60 AD)
- Karikalan III (60-110 AD)
- Maavan Killi (110-130 AD)
- Nedumudikkilli (130-150 AD)
- Chenganan (150-180 AD)
- Isai Ve ngilli (180-210 AD)
- Kaivankilli (210-240 AD)
- Polampoonkilli (240-260 AD)
- Kadumankilli (260-285 AD)
- Nalladi (285-330 AD) known by Agananooru 356th poem
- Chozha Rule in Andhra (300-400 AD)

== See also ==
- List of Tamil people
- List of prominent Sri Lanka Tamils
- Tamil people
- Tamil language
- Dravidian languages

== Bibliography ==
- The Director of Tamil Etymological Dictionary Project of Government of Tamil Nadu, Dr. Mathivanan's book Kadaikkazha Noolhalin Kaalamum Karuthum, published by Thilagam Pathipagam
