= List of Catholic dioceses in Sri Lanka and the Maldives =

The Catholic Church in Indian Ocean island states of Sri Lanka and Maldives is solely composed of

- one Latin ecclesiastical province, comprising a Metropolitan archdiocese and twelve suffragan dioceses, all in Sri Lanka, which jointly constitute the (bi)national Episcopal Conference of Sri Lanka. The Maldives have no actual jurisdiction, but are the responsibility of the Archdiocese of Colombo.

There are no Eastern Catholic, pre-diocesan or other exempt jurisdictions.

All defunct jurisdictions are formerly Ceylonese precursors of present Sri Lankan sees.

There is an Apostolic Nuncio to Sri Lanka resident in the national capital Colombo as papal diplomatic representation at level of an ambassador, and no representation of the Holy See in the Maldives.

== Latin Catholic dioceses in Sri Lanka and Maldives ==
Ecclesiastical Province of Colombo

- Metropolitan Archdiocese of Colombo, which has the entire territory of the Maldives within its jurisdiction
  - Diocese of Anuradhapura
  - Diocese of Badulla
  - Diocese of Batticaloa
  - Diocese of Chilaw
  - Diocese of Galle
  - Diocese of Jaffna
  - Diocese of Kandy
  - Diocese of Kurunegala
  - Diocese of Mannar
  - Diocese of Ratnapura
  - Diocese of Trincomalee

== See also ==
- List of Catholic dioceses (structured view)
- Catholic Church in the Maldives
- Catholic Church in Sri Lanka

== Sources and external links ==
- GCatholic.org - data for all sections.
- Catholic-Hierarchy entry.
