= Thomas Savundaranayagam =

Sri Lankan Tamil priest

Rt Rev. Thomas Savundaranayagam
- Bishop of Jaffna
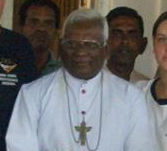
- Native name: தோமசு சௌந்தரநாயகம்
- Church: Roman Catholic Church
- Province: Colombo
- Diocese: Jaffna
- Installed: 6 July 1992
- Term ended: 13 October 2015
- Predecessor: Bastiampillai Deogupillai
- Successor: Justin Gnanapragasam
- Other post: Bishop of Mannar (1981-92)

Personal details
- Born: 13 July 1938 (age 88) Kayts, Ceylon
- Education: Pontifical Urbaniana University

Right Reverend Emmanuel Thomas Savundaranayagam (Tamil: இம்மானுவேல் தோமசு சௌந்தரநாயகம், Sinhala: තෝමස් සවුන්ද්‍රනායගම්; born 13 July 1938) is a Sri Lankan Tamil priest and former Roman Catholic Bishop of Jaffna.

== Early life and family ==
Savundaranayagam was born on 13 July 1938 in Kayts on the island of Velanaitivu in northern Ceylon. He was educated at St. Anthony's College, Kayts and St. Patrick's College, Jaffna. He then studied at St. Martin's Seminary, Jaffna and National Seminary, Ampitiya (1957–64). Savundaranayagam has a Doctor of Sacred Theology degree from the Pontifical Urbaniana University and a Diploma in Catechetics.

== Career ==
Savundaranayagam was ordained as a priest in December 1963. After his ordination he served as an assistant parish priest at St. Mary's Cathedral, Jaffna for few years. In January 1981 he was appointed Bishop of Mannar and was ordained as a bishop in July 1981 at the Shrine of Our Lady of Madhu. He became Bishop of Jaffna in July 1992. He retired in October 2015.

Savundaranayagam is a strong activist for Tamil rights in Sri Lanka and humanitarian efforts in what is sometimes called "Tamil Eelam". He had called for international intervention to stop the Sri Lankan conflict.

Catholic Church titles
New title	Bishop of Mannar; 24 January 1981 – 6 July 1992	Succeeded by Rayappu Joseph
Preceded by Bastiampillai Deogupillai	Bishop of Jaffna; 6 July 1992 – 13 October 2015	Succeeded by Justin Gnanapragasam
