= Bastiampillai Deogupillai =

Ceylon Tamil priest

Rt Rev. Bastiampillai Deogupillai
- Bishop of Jaffna
- Church: Roman Catholic Church
- Province: Colombo
- Diocese: Jaffna
- Installed: 18 December 1972
- Term ended: 6 July 1992
- Predecessor: Jerome Emilianuspillai
- Successor: Thomas Savundaranayagam

Personal details
- Born: 9 April 1917 Karampon, Ceylon
- Died: 25 April 2003 (aged 86)
- Education: St Anthony's College, Kayts; St Patrick's College, Jaffna; Propaganda College; Ceylon University College; University of Ceylon

Right Reverend Jacob Bastiampillai Deogupillai (9 April 1917 – 25 April 2003) was a Ceylon Tamil priest and Roman Catholic Bishop of Jaffna.

== Early life and family ==
Deogupillai was born on 9 April 1917 in Karampon on the island of Velanaitivu in northern Ceylon. He was educated at St Anthony's College, Kayts, and at St Patrick's College, Jaffna. He then studied at the Propaganda College. He later received a BA degree from the Ceylon University College and a Diploma of Education from the University of Ceylon.

== Career ==
Deogupillai was ordained as a priest in Rome in December 1941. After returning to Ceylon he served as parish priest of Karaveddy. He taught for a while before becoming rector of St. Joseph's College, Anuradhapura. He was later rector of Sacred Heart College, Karaveddy, St. Henry's College, Ilavalai and the Teacher Training College, Colombuthurai. After the government took over the Teacher Training College in 1961 Deogupillai resigned as rector and became parish priest of Ilavalai.

In 1967 he was called to be Bishop Auxiliary to Bishop Ignatius Glennie of Trincomalee. After few years of episcopal experience he succeeded Bishop Emilianuspillai in 1971 as the first diocesan Bishop of Jaffna. He retired in July 1992.

Being a historian and an educationist for a greater part of his life, he encouraged his clergy to study the history of the Church as well as of the tradition and cultures of the Tamil People. He had already imbibed from his family a preferential love for the arts and cultures. He went a long way to promote the initiatives of Rev.Fr.N.M Saverimuthu through his center for performing arts and others who tried to preserve Tamil drama.

Besides the harm done to the Catholic children the Catholic Teachers were also affected by the "Schools Take Over". One of his moves to streamline the Catechetical center was to bring Catholic teachers Under it aegis and to organize regular retreats and performance enhancing seminars and updating study programs.

The ethnic situation and the questionable safety of Tamil students in Kandy hastened his vision for the future and made him establish the Philosophate in Jaffna in 1981, which later becomes St. Francis Xavier Seminary, affiliated to the Urban University in Rome.

== Later life ==
After retirement in 1991 Deogupillai lived at St. Martin's Seminary, Jaffna. He received an honorary doctorate from the University of Jaffna for his literary contributions.

Deogupillai died on 25 April 2003. His funeral took place on 28 April 2003 at St. Mary's Cathedral, Jaffna.
