= Cletus Chandrasiri Perera =

Sri Lankan Roman Catholic bishop (1947–2026)

The Most Reverend Cletus Chandrasiri Perera O.S.B.Silv.
- Bishop Emeritus of Ratnapura
- Native name: ක්ලීටස් චන්ද්‍රසිරි පෙරේරා
- Church: Catholic Church
- Archdiocese: Colombo
- Diocese: Ratnapura
- Appointed: 4 May 2007
- Installed: 11 July 2007
- Term ended: 5 March 2024
- Predecessor: Ivan Tilak Jayasundera
- Successor: Peter Antony Wyman Croos

Orders
- Ordination: 4 August 1973
- Consecration: 11 July 2007 by Joseph Vianney Fernando, Malcolm Ranjith and Harold Anthony Perera

Personal details
- Born: 6 September 1947 Seeduwa, British Ceylon
- Died: 24 August 2026 (aged 78) Sri Lanka
- Education: National Seminary of Our Lady of Lanka; Pontifical Athenaeum of Saint Anselm
- Motto: Per crucem ad lucem

Cletus Chandrasiri Perera, O.S.B.Silv. (Sinhala: ක්ලීටස් චන්ද්‍රසිරි පෙරේරා; 6 September 1947 – 24 August 2026) was a Sri Lankan Roman Catholic prelate who served as the bishop of Ratnapura from 2007 to 2024. He was a member of the Benedictine Congregation of Monte Oliveto.

== Early life and ministry ==
Perera was born in Seeduwa, in the Archdiocese of Colombo, on 6 September 1947. He received his primary and secondary education at a Catholic school in Seeduwa before studying philosophy and theology at the National Seminary of Our Lady of Lanka in Kandy.

He entered the Sylvestrine Benedictine congregation, making his first profession on 28 February 1965 and his solemn profession on 17 February 1971. He was ordained a priest on 4 August 1973.

Following his priestly ordination, Perera served as a hospital and prison chaplain in Kandy and as a parish vicar at Padiwatte from 1973 to 1975. He was then a parish vicar at Wahakotte from 1975 to 1978. From 1978 to 1981 he specialized in liturgy at the Athenaeum Sant'Anselmo in Rome. He subsequently served as parish priest at Katugastota, parish vicar at Rajagiriya, and parish priest at Wahakotte, where he was also superior of the Benedictine community at the Shrine of Saint Anthony.

From 1993 to 2002, Perera was vicar general of the Diocese of Kandy. During this period he was also parish priest of the cathedral, director of the diocesan pastoral centre, diocesan youth coordinator, and responsible for Catholic schools. From 2002 he was conventual prior and major superior of the Monastery of Saint Silvester in Kandy, while also serving as a visiting professor at the National Major Seminary of Kandy and as a spiritual director at the minor seminary.

== Bishop of Ratnapura ==
On 4 May 2007, Pope Benedict XVI appointed Perera bishop of Ratnapura, succeeding Ivan Tilak Jayasundera. At the time of his appointment he was prior of the Monastery of Saint Silvester in Kandy.

Perera received his episcopal consecration on 11 July 2007 at the Basilica of the Twelve Holy Apostles in Rome. The principal consecrator was Joseph Vianney Fernando, Bishop of Kandy, with Albert Malcolm Ranjith Patabendige Don and Harold Anthony Perera serving as principal co-consecrators. He was installed as bishop of Ratnapura on 28 July 2007.

As bishop, Perera was involved in interreligious dialogue and ecumenical activity in Sri Lanka. During Pope Francis's 2015 visit to Sri Lanka, Perera, then bishop of Ratnapura and an official responsible for interreligious dialogue within the Catholic Bishops' Conference of Sri Lanka, presented the participants at an interreligious meeting to the pope.

== Retirement and death ==
On 5 March 2024, Pope Francis accepted Perera's resignation from the pastoral government of the Diocese of Ratnapura. Peter Antony Wyman Croos was appointed his successor. Perera subsequently served as apostolic administrator of Ratnapura until 1 June 2024.

Perera died in Sri Lanka on 24 August 2026, at the age of 78, after a long illness. His funeral was announced for 27 August at the diocesan cathedral, where he was also scheduled to be buried.

Catholic Church titles
Preceded by Ivan Tilak Jayasundera	Bishop of Ratnapura; 2007–2024	Succeeded by Peter Antony Wyman Croos
