= Edwin Savundra =

Sri Lankan priest

The Reverend. Dr. Edwin Savundra
- Roman Catholic Priest from Sri Lanka
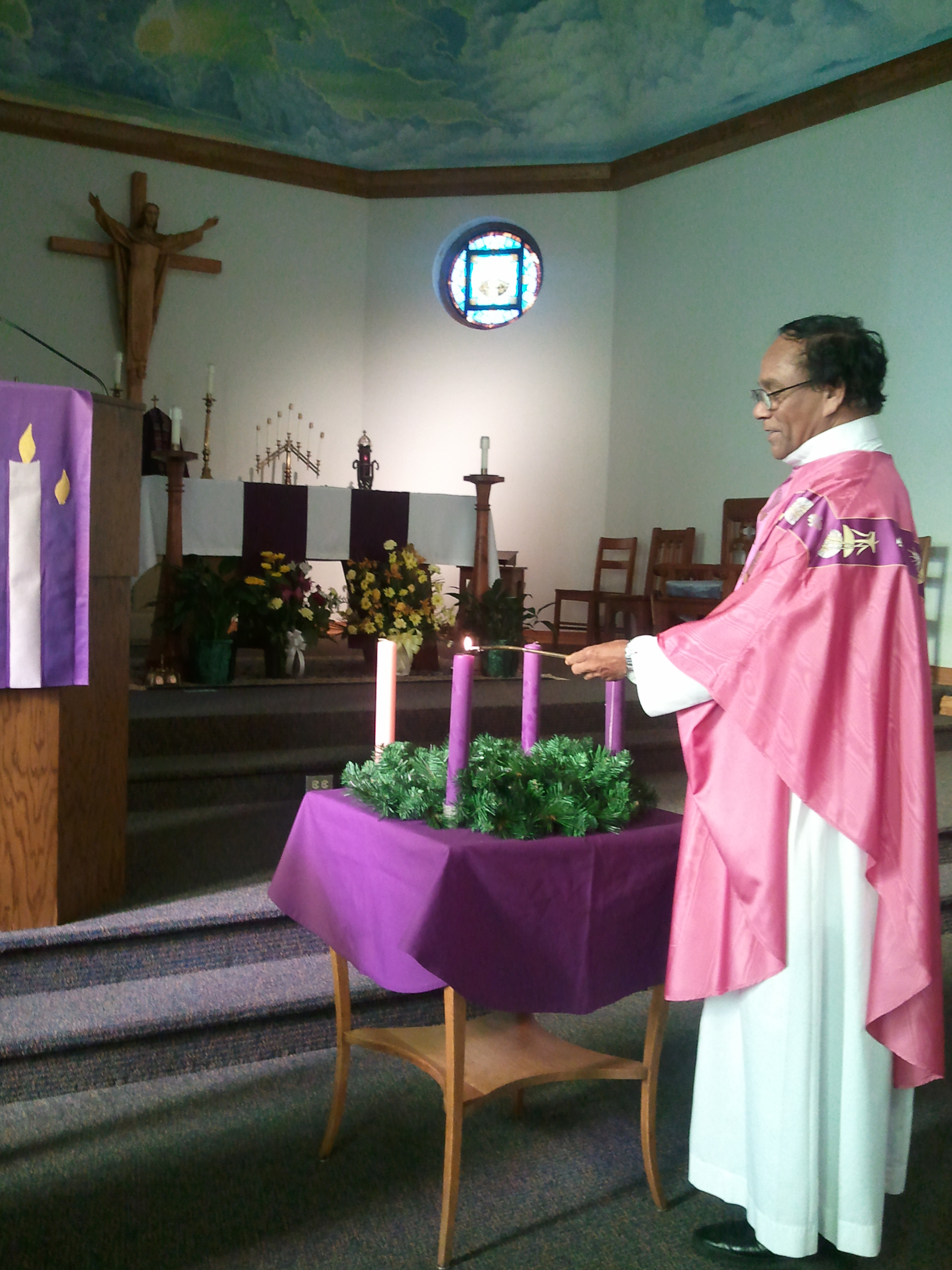
- Church: Roman Catholic Church
- Archdiocese: Saint Paul and Minneapolis
- Diocese: Roman Catholic Diocese of Jaffna

Orders
- Ordination: Oct 19, 1972 by Leo Rajendram Antony

Personal details
- Born: Edwin Savundaranayagam; Oct 12, 1946 Jaffna, Sri Lanka
- Died: Jan 13, 2023 (Aged 76) Buffalo, New York, US
- Buried: Marysburg Cemetery, Le Sueur County, Minnesota, USA; 44.241921°N 93.816555°W
- Parents: Marian Soosai, Isador Sebamalai Pakkiyam
- Education: Doctor of Philosophy
- Alma mater: Pontifical Gregorian University

Rev. Father Edwin Savundra (October 12, 1946 – January 13, 2023) was a Sri Lankan Catholic priest known for his contributions. He founded the English Language Campus, a project dedicated to enhancing English education in the remote villages of Vanni and Mannar, Sri Lanka. Beyond his pastoral role, he also expressed his ideas through several authored books, including the philosophy work titled "The Philosophy of Form and the Human Person".

== Early life ==
Edwin Savundra was born in 1946 into a Catholic family in Ceylon (now known as Sri Lanka), was the youngest child. His education journey began at the local parochial school, and later in 1961 he enrolled at Saint Martin's Minor Seminary in Jaffna. Subsequently, he pursued further studies at St. Patrick's College, Jaffna, and continued his academic pursuits at Sacred Heart Seminary in Poonamallee, Chennai, India in June 1964, where he obtained a bachelor's degree in Philosophy and Theology. During his time at the seminary, he received training under the guidance of the Salesians of Don Bosco.

== Priesthood ==
After completing eight years of formation, Edwin Savundra returned to Jaffna, Sri Lanka, On the 19th of October 1972, he was ordained at St. Mary's Cathedral, Jaffna by His Lordship Bishop Leo Rajendram Antony, alongside Rev. Fr. T. E. Thevarajan and Rev. Fr. J. Nicholas.

His initial assignment was at Saint Theresa's Church in Kilinochchi. Subsequently, in 1973, he was assigned to St. Mary's Cathedral, Jaffna. Responding to Bishop Bastiampillai Deogupillai's request, Fr. Edwin Savundra was later sent to Vidattaltivu in the Roman Catholic Diocese of Mannar in 1974 to serve as the acting parish priest. During his tenure there, he undertook the task of deepening the pond that provided water for the people of Vidattaltivu, making a significant contribution to the community.

He also took on the role of the Assistant Administrator of the Shrine of Our Lady of Madhu and the parish priest of Pandivirichchan in the Roman Catholic Diocese of Mannar from 1974 to 1978. The outstations of the Pandivirichchan Parish included Periyakunchukulam, Periyamurippu, Kallikulam, and the areas along and beyond Aruviaru, Periyathampanai, Sinnapandivirichchan, and Palampiddy. Later, Fr. Edwin Savundra was assigned to Adampan parish in the Roman Catholic Diocese of Mannar from 1978 to 1981, which also had many substations including Manthai, Periyanavatkulam, Siriyanavatkulam, Pappamodai, Thenudaiyan, Nedunkandal, Alkattiveli, Parappukadanthan, Palaikuli, Chalampan, Kannaddy, and Palaiyadi Puthukulam.

In 1981, Fr. Edwin Savundra went to Rome, Italy, for postgraduate studies in philosophy at Pontifical Urban University and received a master's degree. Following this, from 1984 to 1988, he took a period to further enrich his experience, working as a professor of philosophy at Saint Francis Xavier's Seminary in Jaffna. Returning to Rome, he obtained his Ph.D. from the Pontifical Gregorian University between 1988 and 1990. Upon completing his doctorate, he resumed his position at Saint Francis Xavier's Seminary in Jaffna, where he served as the Head of the Department of Philosophy from 1990 to 1996. Additionally, contributed as a visiting lecturer at the University of Jaffna in Western Philosophy from 1994 to 1995.

However, owing to the political climate during the Sri Lankan Civil War, he sought refuge in foreign countries. He chose Papua New Guinea, described as a poor and mission country, and served as a professor of Philosophy from 1997 to 1998 at the Good Shepherd College, Roman Catholic Archdiocese of Mount Hagen in the Western Highlands Province. He had the opportunity to teach at the University of St. Thomas (Minnesota) from 1999 to 2001, and he also conducted classes in the Kilimanjaro Region, Tanzania, and at the National Seminary of Our Lady of Lanka, Kandy, Sri Lanka.

Drawing from his extensive teaching experience, he authored a philosophy book titled "The Philosophy of Form and the Human Person", which serves as a textbook for university students. Fr. Edwin Savundra served in the Archdiocese of Saint Paul and Minneapolis as Parish Administrator (2001–2009) at Nativity Catholic Church in Cleveland, Minnesota, situated about 70 miles southwest of the Twin Cities and five miles north of Marysburg, Minnesota. Later, from 2010 to 2012, he served as the Parish Administrator at Sacred Heart Catholic Church in Rush City, Minnesota. Fr. Edwin Savundra took sick leave in 2012 and officially retired on June 15, 2013.

After retiring from his active pastoral ministry, he returned to the Roman Catholic Diocese of Jaffna in 2013 to continue his mission of assisting the people, particularly after the Sri Lankan Civil War ended in 2008.

Fr. Edwin was involved in initiating numerous humanitarian fundraising initiatives, notably following the Boxing Day tsunami in Sri Lanka. He focus has been on development works in the Dioceses of Jaffna and Mannar while carrying out his mission preaching in the USA. Some of his notable initiatives since becoming a priest include:

- Establishing a Youth Farm at Kunchchukulam.
- Implementing the Fr. Bastian Educational Assistance Scheme.
- Implementing the Fr. Abraham's Educational Assistance Scheme.
- Establishing an English Language Campus and an English Library at Viswamadhu.

Father Edwin Savundra celebrated his golden jubilee of ordination at the Manresa Retreat Center in Pickering, Ontario on October 19, 2022.

== Beauties of Meadows ==
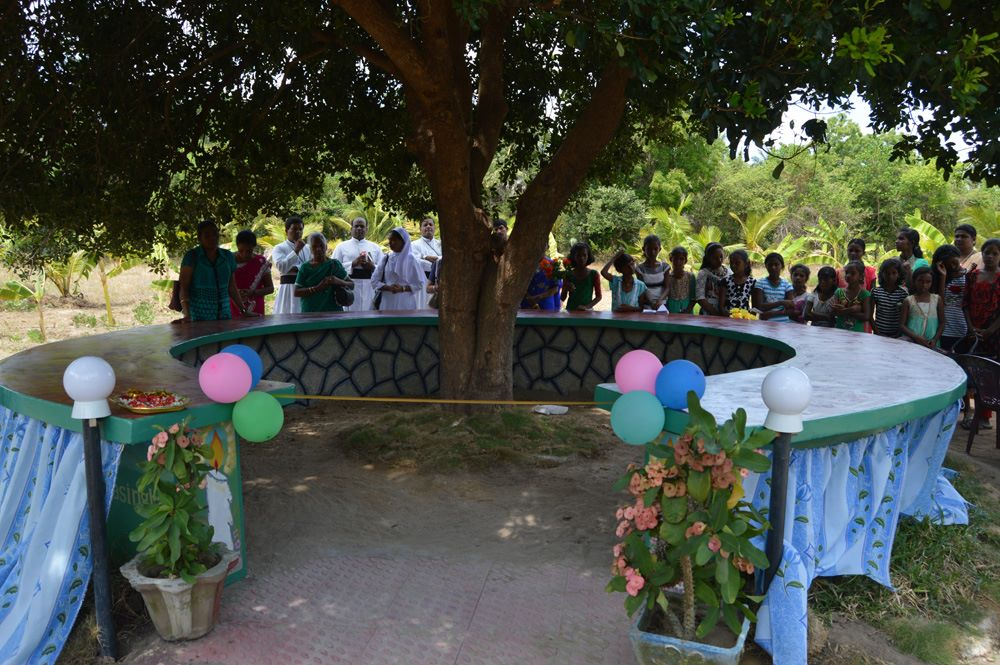
Memorial Shrine - Beauties of Meadows

After returning to the Roman Catholic Diocese of Jaffna, Fr. Edwin Savundra aimed to express gratitude to the priests and a brother (both Christian and Catholic) who lost their lives during the ethnic war between 1984 and 2009. Among them was Jeyarajasingham, a Methodist pastor from Murunkan, who was one of the first victims. The last victim was Rev. Fr. G. A. Francis Joseph, the former Rector of St. Patrick's College, Jaffna.

In remembrance of these brave individuals, a shrine has been established at the English Language Campus, known as the 'Beauties of Meadows'. Every year, on the first Saturday of June, solemn memorial services are held to pay tribute to their lives and sacrifices. These services serve as a meaningful way to remember their contributions and the impact they had.

== English Language Campus ==
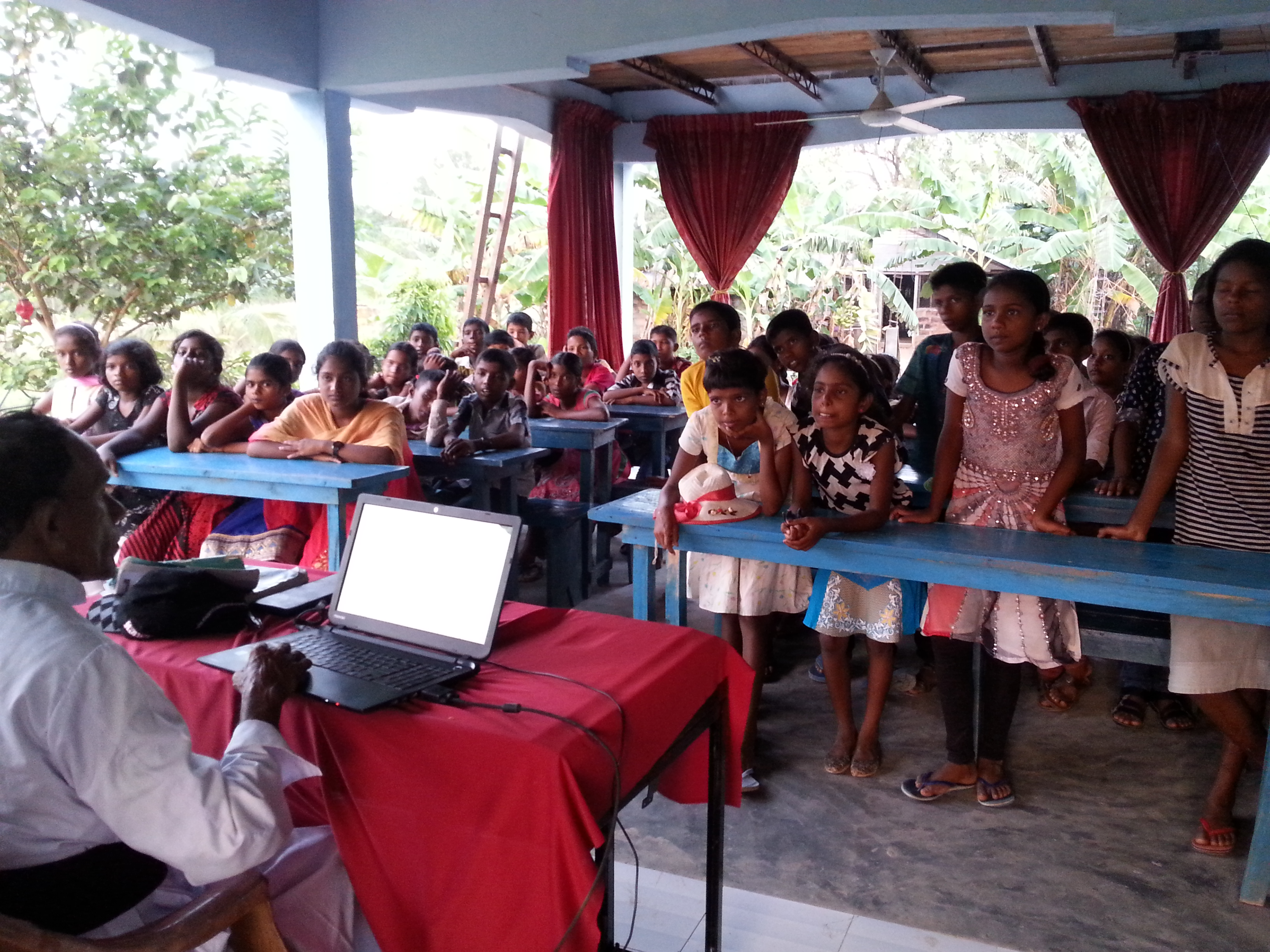
Fr. Edwin was taking English classes at the English Language Campus.

Another specialized ministry was initiated to promote English education, addressing the perceived lack of quality English education in rural areas. Many children from impoverished families may face challenges in receiving adequate English education in their schools. To address this concern, a program was established to enhance English language proficiency in rural communities

On June 6, 2013, the "English Language Campus" was inaugurated in Kilinochchi, marking the commencement of its educational activities with the first batch of students. Fr. Edwin Savundra played a pivotal role in establishing the campus and introduced a residential program known as the English Teacher Training Program. However, due to water scarcity in Kilinochchi, the English Language Campus was relocated to a more suitable location in Punnaineeravi, Visuvamadu. The new site in Punnaineeravi offers abundant water resources and ample space for the development of the campus. Additionally, the campus acquired an additional three acres of land, enabling the construction of a dedicated playground for the students attending the English Language Campus. To further support the language learning journey of the students, an in-house English Library was also established within the premises.

In line with his vision, Fr. Edwin Savundra formed an association called "THE VANNI FEET". (Federation of Empowerment through English Teaching), which consists of charitable organizations actively promoting English education in the Vanni region. The primary goal of this association is to strengthen the region through the provision of quality English education

== Death and Funeral ==
On January 13, 2023, Savundra died at Mercy Hospital in Buffalo, New York. Prayer vigils were held in Visuvamadu, Sri Lanka, his home country, where he had touched the lives of numerous individuals. Additionally, visitation and a mass took place in Toronto, Canada, attended by his family, friends, and former students, some of whom are now priests. The funeral mass was held at the Church of the Nativity in Cleveland, Minnesota, officiated by His Excellency, The Most Reverend Bernard Hebda, Archbishop of the Archdiocese of Saint Paul and Minneapolis, followed by burial at Marysburg Cemetery, in accordance with Fr. Edwin Savundra's wish, on January 26, 2023. The Requiem Mass was also held in Sri Lanka.

== Publications ==
- Structures to Behold – Doctoral Thesis
- A War Diary from Jaffna – An Eye Witness
- Antha Irul Padintha Nadkal – (War Diary in Tamil)
- Philosophy of Form and the Human Person – Anthropological Expose for tertiary institution
