= Justin Gnanapragasam =

Sri Lanka Tamil priest

Rt Rev. Justin Bernard Gnanapragasam
- Bishop of Jaffna
- Native name: ஜஸ்டின் பெர்னார்ட் ஞானப்பிரகாசம்
- Church: Roman Catholic Church
- Province: Colombo
- Diocese: Jaffna
- Installed: 13 October 2015
- Predecessor: Thomas Savundaranayagam

Personal details
- Born: 13 May 1948 (age 78) Karampon, Ceylon
- Education: Papal Seminary

Right Reverend Justin Bernard Gnanapragasam (Tamil: ஜஸ்டின் பெர்னார்ட் ஞானப்பிரகாசம்; born 13 May 1948) is a Sri Lanka Tamil priest and the current Roman Catholic Bishop of Jaffna.

== Early life ==
Gnanapragasam was born on 13 May 1948 in Karampon on the island of Velanaitivu in northern Ceylon. As a young boy serving as an altar boy at St Mary's Church, Kayts, that he showed signs of his vocation to become a priest.

At the age of ten he conveyed his desire to his family that his ambition is to become a priest of a God and begged them continually to send him to the seminary. The parents took Justin to late Bishop Rt. Rev. Dr. Emilianspillai and requested his admission to the seminary. He had his primary education at St Anthony's College, Kayts. Bishop Emilanasapillai permitted him to be admitted at the seminary and Justin entered St Martin's Minor Seminary Jaffna in 1959 and continued his secondary education at St Patrick's College, Jaffna and gained admission to the National Seminary in Kandy. After completing his studies in Philosophy at the National seminary in Kandy, he then entered to Papal Seminary in Pune and studied theology from 1972 to 1974.

== Career ==
Gnanapragasam was ordained as a priest in April 1974. He then held various positions: assistant priest in Kilinochchi and Valaipadu (1974–75); assistant parish priest in Uruthirapuram (1975–76); and assistant priest in Ilavalai (1976–79). Between 1979 and 1980 he studied ecumenical theology at the University of Hull. On returning to Sri Lanka he served as parish priest in Mareesankoodal and vice-rector of St. Henry’s College, Ilavalai (1980–85). He was a lecturer at the University of Jaffna's Department of Christian Civilization from 1982 to 1984.

Gnanapragasam then returned to the UK to study education science in Southampton between 1986 and 1989. He was then director of a group of state schools and rector of St. Henry’s College, Ilavalai (1990–94); dean of the Ilavalai Deanery (1995-02); visiting professor at the major seminary in Jaffna (1992-06); and rector of St. Patrick's College, Jaffna (2002–07).

Rt.Rev.Dr. Justin Gnananpragsam is a scholar with litany academic qualifications specialized in the field of education and has been the rector of St, Henry's College, Illavalai and St. Patrick's College, Jaffna. During this period many students excelled in studies and sports and entered university and won soccer trophies. He was a lecturer in philosophy of dducation at St.Francis Major Seminary, Jaffna.

Gnanapragasam became an examiner of doctoral thesis at University of Jaffna in 2002, vicar general of the Jaffna Diocese in 2007 and director of the diocesan press in 2008. He was a member of the University of Jaffna's senate from 1998 to 2014. On October 13, 2015, Pope Francis appointed him as a Bishop of Jaffna.

== Homily and speeches delivered as bishop ==
As Bishop of Jaffna he continuously requested Sri Lankan Tamil parliamentarians to work together to find a political solution for the Sri Lankan Tamils.

In his homily he often said that abortion is a sin as it kills one soul.

Though he is a bishop, he openly claimedthat some priests are not faithful to the Church and Mission, and though they justify their unfaithfulness with so many reasons, their justification cannot be accepted.

On 28 August 2022, in a speech made at Sillalai he pointed out that "Family life is more difficult compared to priestly life". He also commented that the faith of the people sustains priests.
