= Clemente Pagnani =

Italian bishop (1834–1911)

The Right Reverend Clemente Pagnani OSB.Silv
- Bishop of Kandy
- Installed: 25 November 1886
- Term ended: 27 June 1911 on death
- Predecessor: Office established
- Successor: Bede Beekmeyer
- Previous posts: Vicar Apostolic of Colombo (1879–1883), and Apostolic Vicar of Kandy (1883–1886)

Orders
- Ordination: 25 December 1879

Personal details
- Born: 24 June 1834 Fabriano
- Died: 27 June 1911 (aged 77)
- Denomination: Roman Catholic

Clemente Pagnani OSB.Silv (24 June 1834 – 27 June 1911) was an Italian Catholic missionary in Ceylon who became the first Bishop of Kandy and served from 1886 until his death in 1911.

== Biography ==
Pagnani was born on 24 June 1834 in Fabriano, Italy. In 1857, he was ordained as a priest in the Order of St Benedict and sent as a missionary to Ceylon.

Pagnani was appointed Vicar Apostolic of Colombo and titular Bishop of Hephaestus on 11 November 1879, and was consecrated Bishop of Colombo on 25 December 1879.

Due to a lack of missionaries, the Colombo mission of the Sylvestrine-Benedicts became over-stretched while working in Colombo and the hill district, so in 1883 Pagnani requested the vicariate of Colombo be split into separate vicariates of Colombo and Kandy. Accordingly, Colombo was entrusted to the Oblates mission led by Bonjean and the Sylvestrine Benedicts under Pagnani took over the newly established vicariate of Kandy where the Sylvestrines had maintained a presence since 1855. On the elevation of Kandy to a diocese, Pagnani was appointed the first Vicar Apostolic of Kandy on 20 April 1883, and on 25 November 1886, the first Bishop of Kandy.

Pagnani remained in charge of the Kandy diocese for twenty-eight years until his death on 27 June 1911.

== See also ==
- Christianity in Sri Lanka
- Catholic Church in Sri Lanka
