= Jean-Etienne Sémeria =

French Catholic bishop (1813-1868)

The Right Reverend Jean-Etienne Sémeria OMI
- Vicar Apostolic of Jaffna
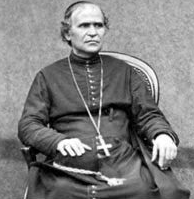
- Installed: 26 July 1857
- Term ended: 23 January 1868
- Predecessor: Orazio Bettacchine
- Successor: Christophe-Etienne Bonjean

Orders
- Ordination: 19 September 1835 as priest
- Consecration: 17 August 1856 by Eugène de Mazenod

Personal details
- Born: 7 February 1813 Colla Micheri, Italy
- Died: 23 January 1868 (aged 54) France
- Buried: Aix-en-Provence
- Denomination: Roman Catholic

Jean-Etienne Sémeria OMI (7 February 1813 – 23 January 1868) was an Italian Catholic missionary and bishop who served as Vicar Apostolic of Jaffna, Ceylon, and founded there the mission of the Oblates in the 1850s.

== Biography ==
Sémeria was born on 7 February 1813 in Colla Micheri, Italy. Two of his uncles were Catholic priests and an aunt was a sister of the Capuchins. In 1833, he began studying theology, and in 1835, was ordained as a priest at Notre-Dame du Laus, France. In 1840, he was sent to Corsica as father superior.

In 1847, Sémeria was sent to Jaffna, Ceylon at the request of Orazio Bettachini, coadjutor of the Apostolic Vicar of Colombo. He arrived at the end of the year with three missionaries and served as priest and secretary to the Bishop of Jaffna. On 6 June 1856, he was appointed coadjutor Vicar of the Apostolic of Jaffna and titular bishop of Olympus, and was consecrated as bishop on 17 August 1856 by Bishop Eugène de Mazenod in Montolivet, France.

In 1857, on the death of Bettachini, Sémeria succeeded him to the office of Apostolic Vicar of Jaffna, and the Jaffna vicariate was handed over to the Oblates marking the beginning of the rise of the Oblates to leadership in Ceylon. He soon formed a team of missionaries including Fr Bonjean, Fr Chauvenal and Fr Le Besco, but was faced with the problem of a shortage of priests. On a visit to Europe, he returned with the first women Catholic missionaries to serve in Ceylon, six sisters of the Holy Family of France. During his episcopacy, he opened schools, orphanages, presbyteries and a seminary, and built seven churches. Sisters of the Holy Family of Bordeaux were brought to manage schools and open dispensaries, and the orphanages were supported by the Association of the Holy Childhood in Paris. By 1861, the number of Christians in the diocese of Jaffna had reached 55,000.

In 1868, while attending the General Chapter in France, Sémeria was taken ill and died on 23 January 1868, and was buried in Aix-en-Provence.
