= Jerome Emilianuspillai =

Ceylon Tamil priest and Roman Catholic Bishop of Jaffna

Rt Rev. Jerome Emilianuspillai OMI
- Bishop of Jaffna
- Church: Roman Catholic Church
- Province: Colombo
- Diocese: Jaffna
- Installed: 18 July 1950
- Term ended: 17 July 1972
- Predecessor: Alfred-Jean Guyomard
- Successor: Bastiampillai Deogupillai

Personal details
- Born: 20 July 1901 Wennappuwa, Ceylon
- Died: 17 July 1972 (aged 70)
- Education: St. Patrick's College, Jaffna

Right Reverend Jerome Emilianuspillai (20 July 1901 – 17 July 1972) was a Ceylon Tamil priest and Roman Catholic Bishop of Jaffna.

== Early life and family ==
Emilianuspillai was born on 20 July 1901 in Wennappuwa in western Ceylon. His father was a teacher in Wennappuwa. He was educated at St Patrick's College, Jaffna.

== Career ==
Emilianuspillai was ordained as a priest in July 1929. In July 1950 he became Bishop of Jaffna. He was the first Tamil Catholic bishop of Ceylon.

He encouraged others to pray with trust and conviction. His sermons, which reflected his strong faith, were simple, clear, and resonated with his audience.

He visited the priests often, especially those who worked in far-off and difficult missions. He took much interest in the spiritual and material well being of all Religious Congregations. He closely followed their growth and ongoing formation, helping and encouraging them.

Emilianuspillai died on 17 July 1972.
