= Antoine Coudert =

French Catholic Archbishop (1861-1929)

His Grace, the Most Rev. Antoine Coudert OMI
- Archbishop, Archdiocese of Colombo
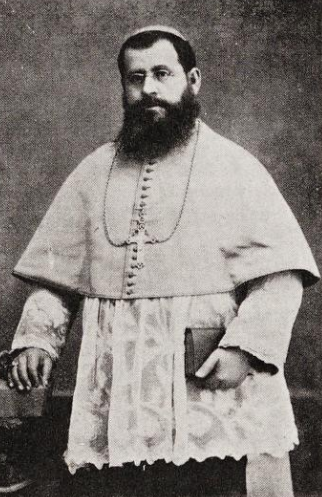
- Installed: 27 June 1905
- Term ended: 31 March 1929
- Predecessor: André Théophile Mélizan
- Successor: Pierre Guillame Marque
- Other posts: Previously Coadjutor Archbishop of Colombo, and Titular Archbishop of Balanea

Orders
- Ordination: 10 April 1886 as Priest, and 28 June 1898 as Coadjutor Archbishop of Colombo and Titular Archbishop of Balanea
- Consecration: 27 June 1905 as Archbishop of Colombo

Personal details
- Born: 17 March 1861 Manglieu, France
- Died: 31 March 1929 (aged 68) Colombo
- Denomination: Roman Catholic

Antoine Coudert OMI (17 March 1861 – 31 March 1929) was a French Catholic missionary who served as Archbishop of Colombo, Ceylon, from 1905 to 1929.

== Early life and education ==
Coudert was born on 17 March 1861 in Manglieu, France. He was educated at Billom College, and attended the seminary of Cleremont-Ferrand where he was ordained a priest of the Oblates of Mary Immaculate on 10 April 1886.

== Career ==
In 1886, Coudert was sent to Ceylon as a missionary priest, and took charge of various missions including, in succession, those at Ampalangoda, Beruwela, Kotahena and Vernapurai. In 1898, whilst serving as the Superior of the districts of Chilaw and Puttalam, due to the failing health of Archbishop Mélizan, he was appointed Coadjutor Archbishop of Colombo with the right of succession, and Titular Archbishop of Balanea, and was ordained as Archbishop on 30 November 1898.

On 27 June 1905, on the death of Archbishop Mélizan, Coudert succeeded as Archbishop of Colombo. At the time of his succession there were 97 missionaries, including 90 Oblate Fathers, and 206,000, mostly Sinhalese Catholics, in the Archdiocese. Whilst Archbishop of Colombo he is credited with establishing many Catholic schools including St. Peter's College Colombo, Maris Stella College, Holy Cross College, Gampaha, and St Mary's College, Dehiwala.

Coudert died on 31 March 1929 in Colombo.
