= Henri Joulain =

French Catholic bishop (1842–1919)

The Right Reverend, Dr Henri Joulain OMI
- Bishop of Jaffna
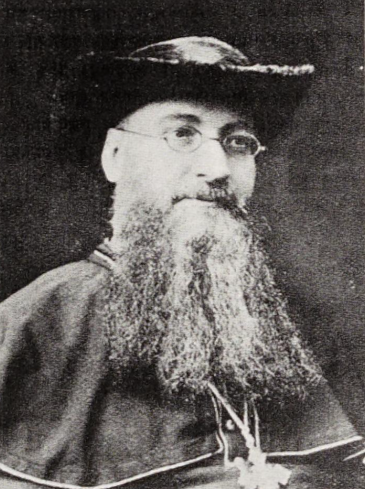
- Installed: 20 July 1893
- Term ended: 8 February 1919
- Predecessor: André-Théophile Mélizan
- Successor: Jules-André Brault

Orders
- Ordination: 22 May 1875 as priest
- Consecration: 24 August 1893 by André-Théophile Mélizan

Personal details
- Born: 24 September 1852 Poitiers, France
- Died: 8 February 1919 (aged 66) Jaffna
- Denomination: Roman Catholic

Henri Joulain OMI (24 September 1852 – 8 February 1919) was a French Catholic missionary and bishop who served as Bishop of Jaffna, Ceylon from 1893 to 1919.

== Biography ==
Joulain was born on 24 September 1852 in Poitiers, France. He received his education and training at the Montmorillon and Poitiers seminaries. He joined the Missionary Oblates of Mary Immaculate (OMI) and was ordained priest at Poitiers in 1875. He was sent as a missionary to Ceylon and arrived in Colombo in 1880. He often ministered from the Shrine of Our Lady of Madhu in Mannar District, a popular pilgrimage site where the spring water and earth were believed to have the power of healing. On 20 July 1893, he was appointed Bishop of Jaffna, Ceylon, and on 24 Aug 1893 was consecrated by Archbishop André-Théophile Mélizan. In 1906, he visited Rome where he was received by Pope Pius X.

After having been in poor health for some time, Joulain died at Jaffna on 8 February 1919, aged 66.
