= Materiana =

Africa Proconsularis.

Materiana was a city in the late Roman province of Byzacena. A titular see, it was located the central Sahel region of Tunisia.

== Ecclesiastical history ==
Materiana was an episcopal see but no longer has a diocesan bishop. Accordingly, it is included in the Catholic Church's list of titular sees. The only known bishop of this diocese from antiquity is Peregrino, who took part in the synod gathered in Carthage by the Vandal king of Hunaric in 484, after which he was exiled.

Today, Materiana survives as a titular bishop's seat; the current titular bishop is Anton Ranjith Pillainayagam, auxiliary bishop of Colombo.
