= Anton Ranjith Pillainayagam =

Bishop of Jaffna

His Excellency,The Most Reverend Anton Ranjith Pillainayagam
- Bishop of Jaffna
- Church: Catholic
- Diocese: Jaffna
- See: Titular Bishop of Materiana
- Appointed: June 29, 2026
- Predecessor: Justin Bernard Gnanapragasam
- Other post: Apostolic Administrator of Batticaloa, Sri Lanka
- Previous post: Auxiliary Bishop of Colombo

Orders
- Ordination: September 16, 2000
- Consecration: August 29, 2020 by Malcolm Ranjith

Personal details
- Born: September 23, 1966 (age 60) Jaffna, Sri Lanka
- Education: St. Francis Xavier Major Seminary, Jaffna; National Seminary, Kandy
- Motto: Dominus Est (Latin for 'It is the Lord')

Anton Ranjith Pillainayagam, also known as Anton Ranjith, was born on September 23, 1966, in Jaffna. He served as Auxiliary Bishop of the Archdiocese of Colombo from July 2020 until his appointment as Bishop of Diocese of Jaffna (Catholic) in June 2026. He has also been serving as the director of Tamil Theologate since 2009 and as the Rector of St. Sebastian's College, Moratuwa since 2019.

== Career ==
He pursued his primary and secondary education at St. Benedict's College, Colombo in 1973 in Colombo and at St. Patrick's College from 1974 onwards. He studied philosophy at the St. Francis Xavier Major Seminary in Jaffna and studied theology at the National Seminary of Kandy. He obtained his bachelor's degree in mathematics from the University of Jaffna. He also received his master's degree in education from the University of Middlesex and Master's degree in philosophy from the University of Jaffna.

He was ordained a priest on September 16, 2000, in the Cathedral of St. Lucia, Colombo. On July 13, 2020, he was appointed the new Auxiliary Bishop in the Roman Catholic Archdiocese of Colombo by Pope Francis.
