= Anthony Jayakody =

Sri Lankan RC bishop

Jayakody Aratchige Don Anthony Jayakody
- Auxiliary Bishop of Colombo
- Archdiocese: Archdiocese of Colombo
- Province: Western
- Metropolis: Colombo
- See: Titular Bishop of Mulli
- Appointed: 4 April 2018

Orders
- Ordination: 27 July 1985 (priest); 23 June 2018 (auxiliary bishop)
- Consecration: 11 February 2012 by Malcolm Ranjith

Personal details
- Born: 2 October 1958 (age 67) Pamunugama, Sri Lanka
- Denomination: Roman Catholicism
- Residence: Archbishop's House Colombo
- Profession: priest
- Education: St. Joseph’s Roman Catholic School; Gonsalves College, Pamunugama; St. Aloysius’ Minor Seminary; National Seminary, Ampitiya, Kandy

Jayakody Aratchige Don Anthony Jayakody (born 2 October 1958, in Pamunugama, Sri Lanka) is one of the three Auxiliary Bishops of the Archdiocese of Colombo, appointed on 4 April 2018 and consecrated on 23 June 2018. He is also the Titular Bishop of Mulli.

Catholic Church titles
Preceded by Vincent Marius Joseph Peiris	Auxiliary Bishop of Colombo; 2018–	Succeeded by —
Preceded by Gregorio Rosa Chávez	Titular Bishop of Mulli; 2018–	Succeeded by —
