= Marius Peiris =

Sri Lankan Roman Catholic prelate (1941–2024)

Vincent Marius Joseph Peiris
- Auxiliary Bishop Emeritus of Colombo
- Appointed: 16 November 2000
- Term ended: 4 April 2018
- Other post: Titular Bishop of Tacarata (2000–2024)

Orders
- Ordination: 25 January 1972
- Consecration: 3 February 2001 by Nicholas Fernando

Personal details
- Born: 11 October 1941 Moratuwa, British Ceylon
- Died: 13 May 2024 (aged 82) Colombo, Sri Lanka

Vincent Marius Joseph Peiris (11 October 1941 – 13 May 2024) was a Sri Lankan Roman Catholic prelate.

== Biography ==
Vincent Peiris was ordained a priest on 25 January 1972. In the years 1973–1975 he was pro-rector at the theological seminary in Ampitiya. In 1976 he began studying political science at the University of London, graduating three years later with a Ph.D. After returning to his homeland, he again became a professor in Ampitiya, where he worked until 1989. He was then appointed parish priest in Halpe (1989–1992) and in Dehiwela (1992–1995). In the years 1995–1998 he was vicar general for the archdiocese of Colombo, and then, until his episcopal consecration, rector of the seminary in Ampitiya. On 16 November 2000, he was appointed by Pope John Paul II as auxiliary bishop of the Archdiocese of Colombo, with the titular see of Tacarata. He was ordained a bishop on 3 February 2001 by the then Ordinary of the same archdiocese, Archbishop Nicholas Marcus Fernando. He was secretary of the Catholic Bishops' Conference of Sri Lanka. He was responsible for the opening of a new philosophy center in the seminary and the creation of the six-monthly theological periodical, "Living Faith", for the country's clergy and religious. He served as the auxiliary bishop of the Roman Catholic Archdiocese of Colombo from 2000 to 2018 when Pope Francis granted his age-related resignation. He died on 13 May 2024, at the age of 82.

Catholic Church titles
| Preceded by — | Auxiliary Bishop of Colombo; 2000–2018 | Succeeded by — |
| Preceded by Philip Francis Murphy | Titular Bishop of Tacarata; 2000–2024 | Succeeded by Vacant |
