= Diocese of Ratnapura =

Latin Catholic diocese in Sri Lanka

Coordinates: 6.6810°N 80.4028°E

Diocese of Ratnapura Dioecesis Ratnapurensis இரத்தினபுரி மறைமாவட்டத்தின்

Location
- Country: Sri Lanka
- Ecclesiastical province: Colombo
- Metropolitan: Colombo

Statistics
- Area: 4,968 km^{2} (1,918 sq mi)
- Population: Total; Catholics: (as of 2010); 1,896,941; 25,712 (1.4%)

Information
- Denomination: Catholic Church
- Sui iuris church: Latin Church
- Rite: Roman Rite
- Established: 2 November 1995
- Cathedral: St. Peter and Paul Cathedral, Ratnapura

Current leadership
- Pope: Leo XIV
- Bishop: Anton Wyman Croos
- Metropolitan Archbishop: Malcolm Ranjith
- Bishops emeritus: Ivan Thilak Jayasundara

Website
- https://www.dioceseofratnapura.com/

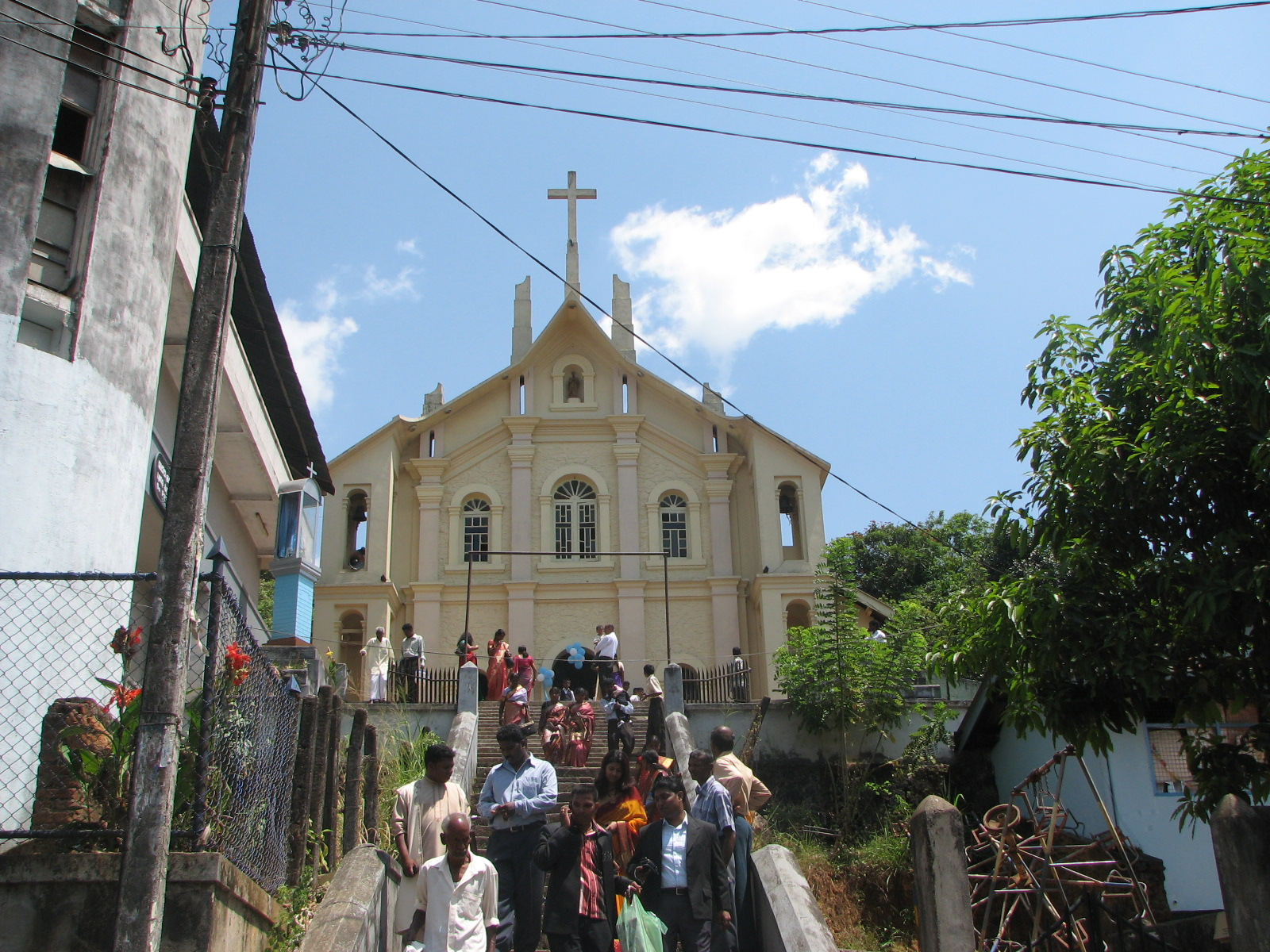
Peter Paul Catholic Cathedral.jpg

Diocese of Ratnapura (Lat: Dioecesis Ratnapurensis) is a Latin Catholic diocese of the Catholic Church in Sri Lanka.

Erected as the Diocese of Ratnapura in 1995, from the Diocese of Galle territory, the diocese is suffragan to the Archdiocese of Colombo.

The current bishop is Peter Antony Wyman Croos, appointed in 2024.

== Ordinaries ==
- Malcolm Ranjith (2 Nov 1995 – 1 Oct 2001), appointed to various curial positions and later appointed Archbishop of Colombo (elevated to Cardinal in 2010)
- Harold Anthony Perera (29 Jan 2003 – 15 Feb 2005), appointed Bishop of Galle and later Bishop of Kurunegala
- Ivan Tilak Jayasundera (20 Jan 2006 – 6 Jul 2006), resigned before episcopal consecration due to poor health
- Cletus Chandrasiri Perera, O.S.B.Silv. (4 May 2007 – 5 Mar 2024)
- Peter Antony Wyman Croos (2024 – present)

== See also ==
- Catholic Church in Sri Lanka
