= Gurunagar =

Gurunagar குருநகர் ගුරුනගර
- Suburb
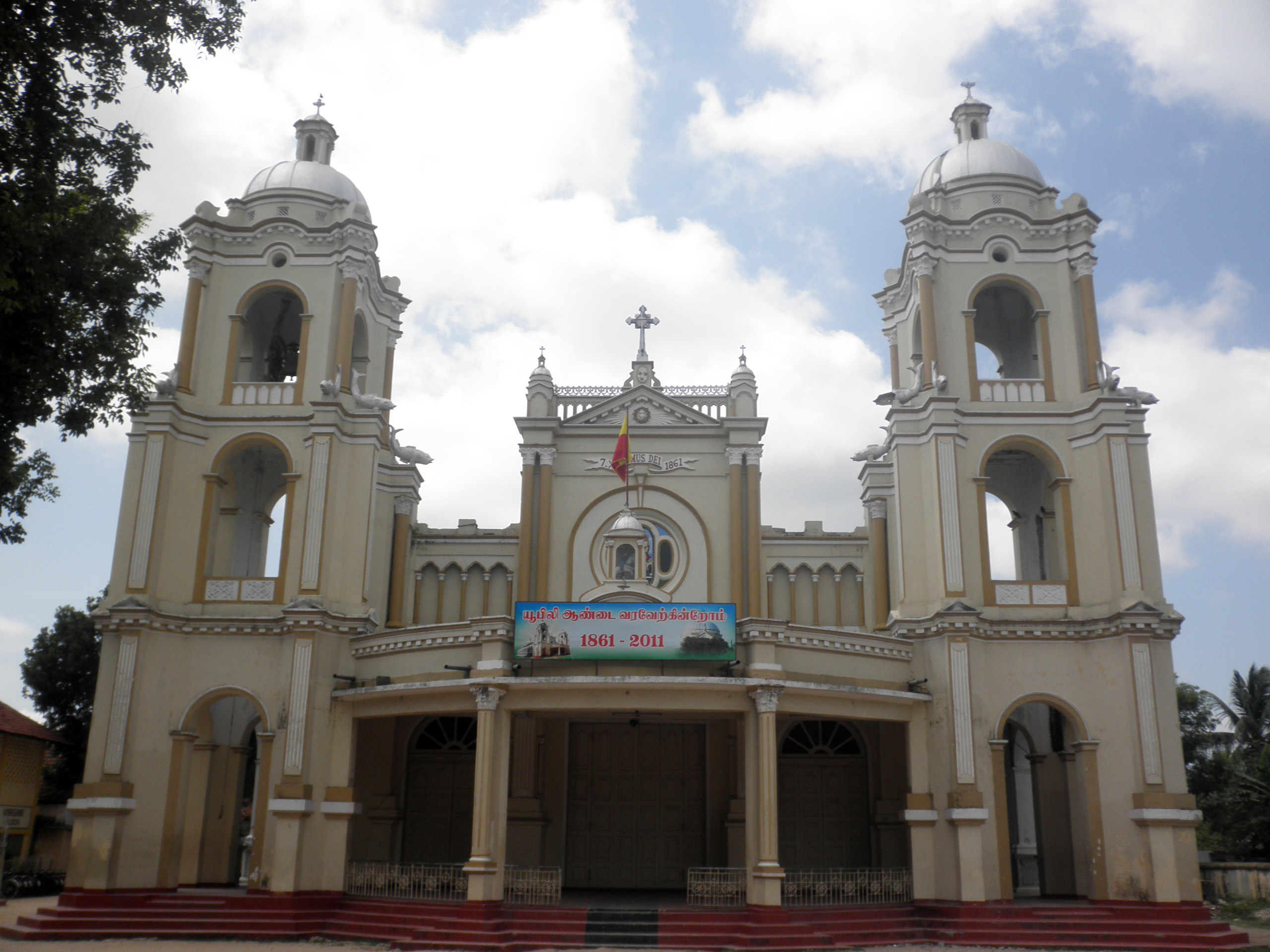
- St. James' Church, originally established in 1861

- Location within Northern Province Location within Sri Lanka
- Coordinates: 9°39′24.80″N 80°01′41.10″E
- Country: Sri Lanka
- Province: Northern
- District: Jaffna
- DS Division: Jaffna

Government
  - Type: Municipal Council
  - Body: Jaffna

Population (2015)
  - Total: 3,600
- Time zone: UTC+5:30 (Sri Lanka Standard Time Zone)
- Post Codes: 4136050-4136055
- Telephone Codes: 021
- Vehicle registration: NP

Gurunagar (Tamil: குருநகர், romanized: Kurunakar) is a coastal village in Jaffna city in northern Sri Lanka. Gurunagar is also known as Karaiyur (Tamil: கரையூர், romanized: Karaiyūr).

The suburb is divided into two village officer divisions (Gurunagar East and Gurunagar West) whose combined population was 3,520 at the 2012 census.

The suburb is mainly populated by Catholic Sri Lankan Tamils, engaged in sea activities. The village is known in Jaffna due to its maritime history and also served as the western sector of the Jaffna Kingdom.

== Etymology ==
Gurunagar, also spelled as Kurunagar derives its words from Kuru and Nagar (Urban centre in Tamil). The word Kuru is a clans name used by the Karaiyars also known as Kurukulam, who make up majority of Gurunagar.

Karaiyur, as it was earlier known as stems from the Tamil words Karai (coast) and Ur (village). Karaiyur was marked in the Dutch maps as Cereoer.

== History ==
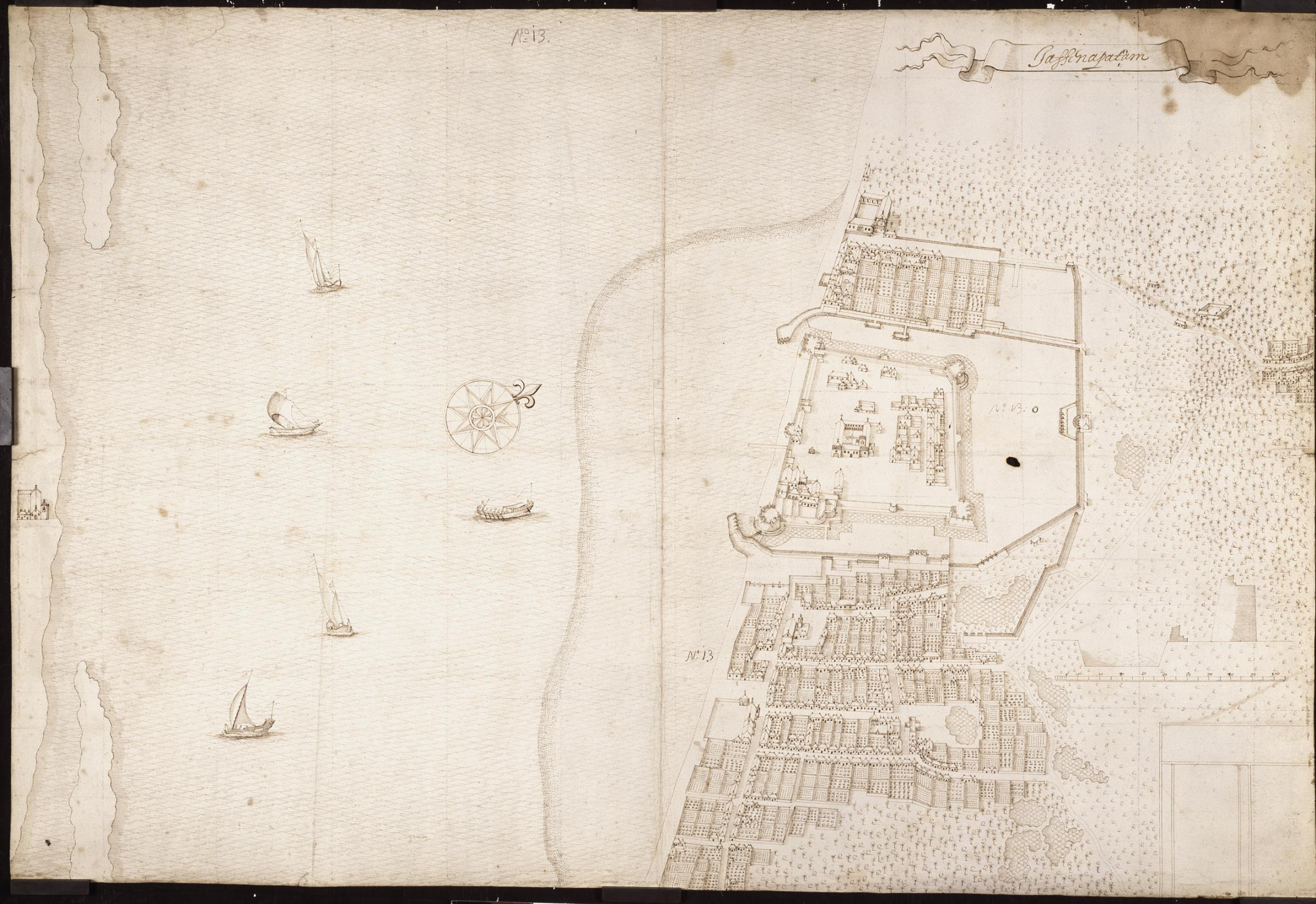
Old map of Jaffna, depicting the settlement of Gurunagar near the Jaffna fort.

The earliest settlers of Jaffna, were according to local legend, a musician and his kinsfolk. The surmised place they first settled is in the area surrounding Gurunagar and Colombuthurai. The Columbuthurai Commercial Harbor situated at Colombuthurai and the harbor known as ‘Aluppanthy’ situated previously at the Gurunagar area seem as its evidences.

The navy of the Aryacakravarti dynasty was crewed and officered by the people of Gurunagar. The Pattinathurai of Gurunagar was a port for foreign vessels. It is surmised that it was here the Moroccan explorer Ibn Battuta, saw fleet of ships that belonged to the Aryacakravarti kings. The Maniagar and Adappans of Gurunagar served as one of the headmen of the Jaffna ports.

The western section of the Jaffna Kingdom was allotted by the Karaiyars of Gurunagar. There existed a smaller fort in Colombuthurai and one at Pannaithurai near Gurunagar. In 1560, the Portuguese forces with 77 ships arrived in Gurunagar and defeated the Tamil army governing there before proceeding further to Nallur.

The Cathedral of Jaffna in Gurunagar was constructed over an already existing smaller chapel. The chapel was constructed as the place where the Jaffna king Cankili I killed his own son for converting to Catholicism.

Starting from the early 1920s, was the Gurunagar land reclamation scheme started, starting from modern Beach Road to Reclamation Road.

== See also ==
- St. Mary's Cathedral, Jaffna
- St. Patrick's College, Jaffna
- Gurunagar fisherman sea massacre
