= Diocese of Galle =

Latin Catholic diocese in Sri Lanka

Coordinates: 6.0357°N 80.2127°E

Diocese of Galle Dioecesis Gallensis காலி மாவட்ட
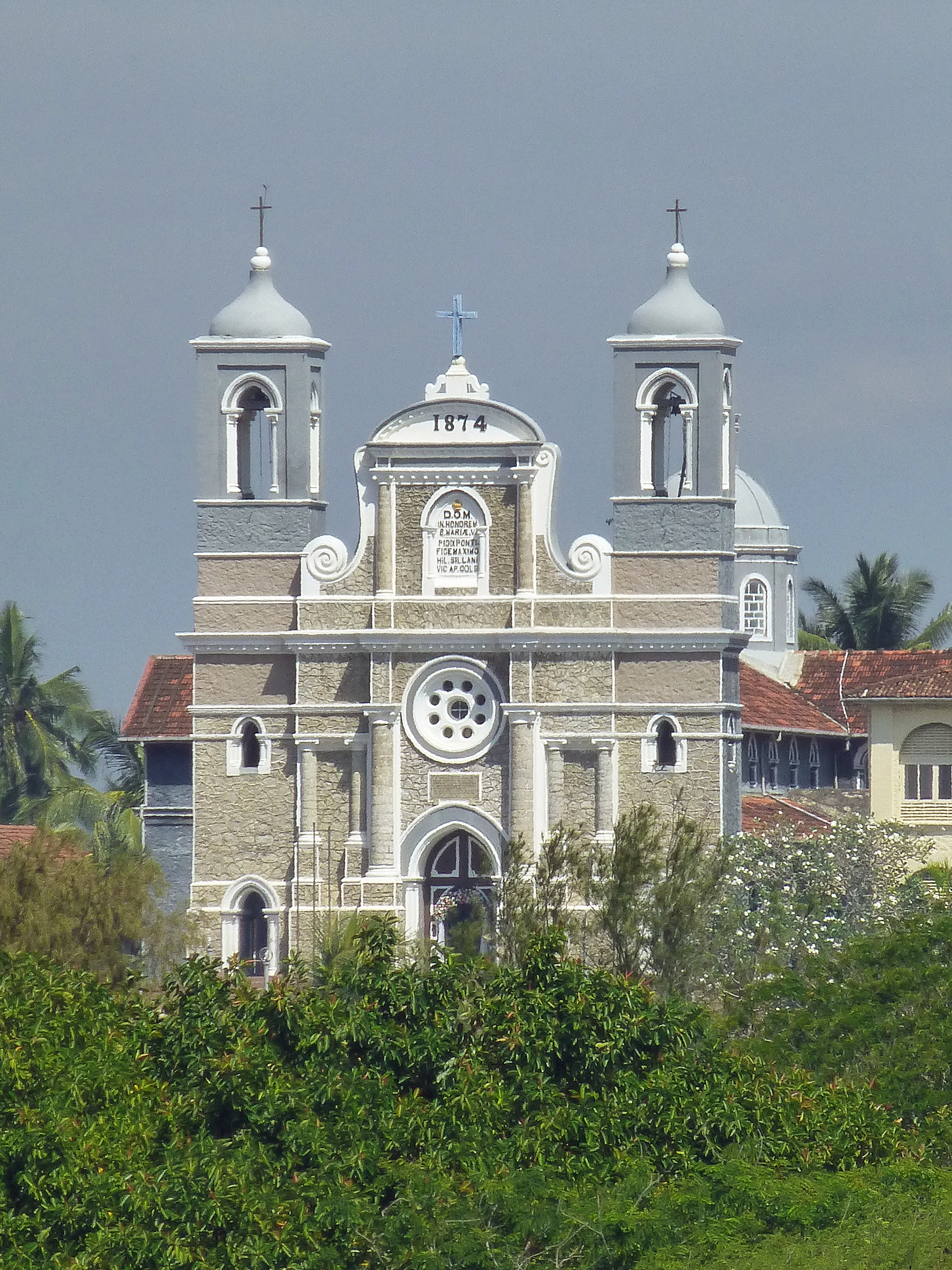
- St. Mary's Cathedral, Galle

Location
- Country: Sri Lanka
- Ecclesiastical province: Colombo
- Metropolitan: Colombo

Statistics
- Area: 5,493 km^{2} (2,121 sq mi)
- Population: Total; Catholics: (as of 2006); 2,277,145; 8,587 (0.4%)

Information
- Denomination: Catholic Church
- Sui iuris church: Latin Church
- Rite: Roman Rite
- Cathedral: St. Mary's Cathedral, Galle
- Patron saint: Saint Joseph

Current leadership
- Pope: Leo XIV
- Bishop: Raymond Kingsley Wickramasinghe
- Metropolitan Archbishop: Malcolm Ranjith

Website
- Website of the Diocese

The Diocese of Galle (Latin: Dioecesis Gallensis) is a Latin Catholic diocese of the Catholic Church in Sri Lanka.

Erected as the Diocese of Galle in 1893, the diocese is suffragan to the Metropolitan Archdiocese of Colombo. In 1995, part of the diocese was split off to form the Diocese of Ratnapura

The current bishop is Raymond Kingsley Wickramasinghe, appointed in 2011.

== History ==
The Southern and Sabaragamuwa Provinces were part of the Metropolitan Archdiocese of Colombo (1887) and, before, of the "Southern Vicarate of Ceylon" (1847). The diocese was established in 1893 and entrusted to the Belgian Jesuits who, the same year, had opened the Pontifical Seminary of Kandy under the direction of Fr Sylvain Grosjean. Apostolically linked to the new diocese, the seminary was founded at the explicit request of Pope Leo XIII.

The original Diocese of Galle comprised the Southern and Sabaragamuwa civil Provinces of Sri Lanka. As such it extended from the foothills of Utuwankanda to the coastal parish of Hambantota, covering an area of 403,875 square miles (1,046,000 km^{2}) of the most varied aspect from the point of view of scenery, population and pastoral engagements.

However, right back into the time of Blessed Joseph Vaz and his Oratorian disciples and still earlier in Portuguese times (mid-16th century) stations in its coastal fringe as well as in its Ratnapura reaches are on record for Evangelisation and advanced pastoral structure.

After the division of the diocese in 1995 into Ratnapura, nearly 9000 Catholics are still spread unevenly across the hills and dales and beaches of the Galle Diocese. The present diocese of Galle has a geographical area comprising the Southern Province embracing Galle, Matara and Hambantota civil districts, having an area of 5,493 square kilometres (2,121 sq mi). The membership of the Presbyterium counts 28 priests of whom 24 are diocesans and four Religious and serve in 12 parishes and other institutions of Diocesan Apostolates. Nearly 90 Religious Sisters extend their supportive hands in serving the people of God in Ruhunu Rata Diocese.

The first bishop of the diocese was the Belgian Jesuit Joseph Van Reeth, S. J., who guided the destinies of the infant diocese from 1893 to 1923. Gaston Robchez, the Bishop of Trincomalee and Apostolic Administrator of Galle for ten years (1923–1933). The last Jesuit bishop Msg. Nicholas Laudadio took up the responsibilities of the diocese in 1933 for 30 years.

Anthony De Saram, sent from Colombo, became the first diocesan bishop of the diocese in 1964 until 1982. With his demise, Sylvester Wewitavidanelage was installed in 1982 until 1993. In 1993 Elmo Noel Joseph Perera, a priest originating from the diocese, was installed the Bishop of Galle. He served the diocese till his retirement in 1995. Terrence Leanage took over the affairs of the diocese as Apostolic Administrator. Bishop Harold Anthony Perera, Bishop of Ratnapura, was installed on 8 March 2005.

== Ordinaries ==
- Joseph Van Reeth, † (11 Jan 1895 Appointed - 1923 died)
- Nicholas Laudadio, † (28 May 1934 Appointed - 26 May 1964 retired)
- Anthony de Saram † (22 Mar 1965 Appointed - 28 Feb 1982 died)
- Don Sylvester Wewitavidanelage † (15 Oct 1982 Appointed - 9 Nov 1995 died)
- Elmo Noel Joseph Perera † (1 Jun 1995 Appointed - 11 Oct 2004 resigned)
- Harold Anthony Perera (15 Feb 2005 Appointed - 14 May 2009, became Bishop of Kurunegala)
- Raymond Kingsley Wickramasinghe (27 May 2011 Appointed – present)

== See also ==
- Catholic Church in Sri Lanka
