= Roman Catholic Diocese of Chilaw =

Latin Catholic diocese in Sri Lanka

Coordinates: 7.5782°N 79.7925°E

Diocese of Chilaw Dioecesis Chilavensis சிலாபம் மறைமாவட்டம்

Location
- Country: Sri Lanka
- Ecclesiastical province: Colombo
- Metropolitan: Colombo

Statistics
- Area: 2,076 km^{2} (802 sq mi)
- Population: Total; Catholics: (as of 1235); 788,000; 272,692 (34.6%)

Information
- Denomination: Catholic Church
- Sui iuris church: Latin Church
- Rite: Roman Rite
- Established: 5 January 1939
- Cathedral: Cathedral of Our Lady of Mount Carmel in Chilaw
- Patron saint: Sacred Heart of Jesus

Current leadership
- Pope: Leo XIV
- Bishop: Arachchige Jayasuriya
- Metropolitan Archbishop: Malcolm Ranjith
- Vicar General: Rev. Fr. Ashok Priyantha Perera
- Episcopal Vicars: Rev. Fr. Patrick Wijesinghe

Website
- chilawdiocese.org

The Diocese of Chilaw (Lat: Dioecesis Chilavensis) is a diocese of the Latin Church of the Catholic Church in Sri Lanka.

Erected as the Diocese of Galle in 1939, the diocese is suffragan to the Archdiocese of Colombo. In 1995, part of the diocese was split off to form the Diocese of Kurunegala.

The current bishop is Don Wimal Siri Appuhamy Jayasuriya, who was appointed in December 2023.

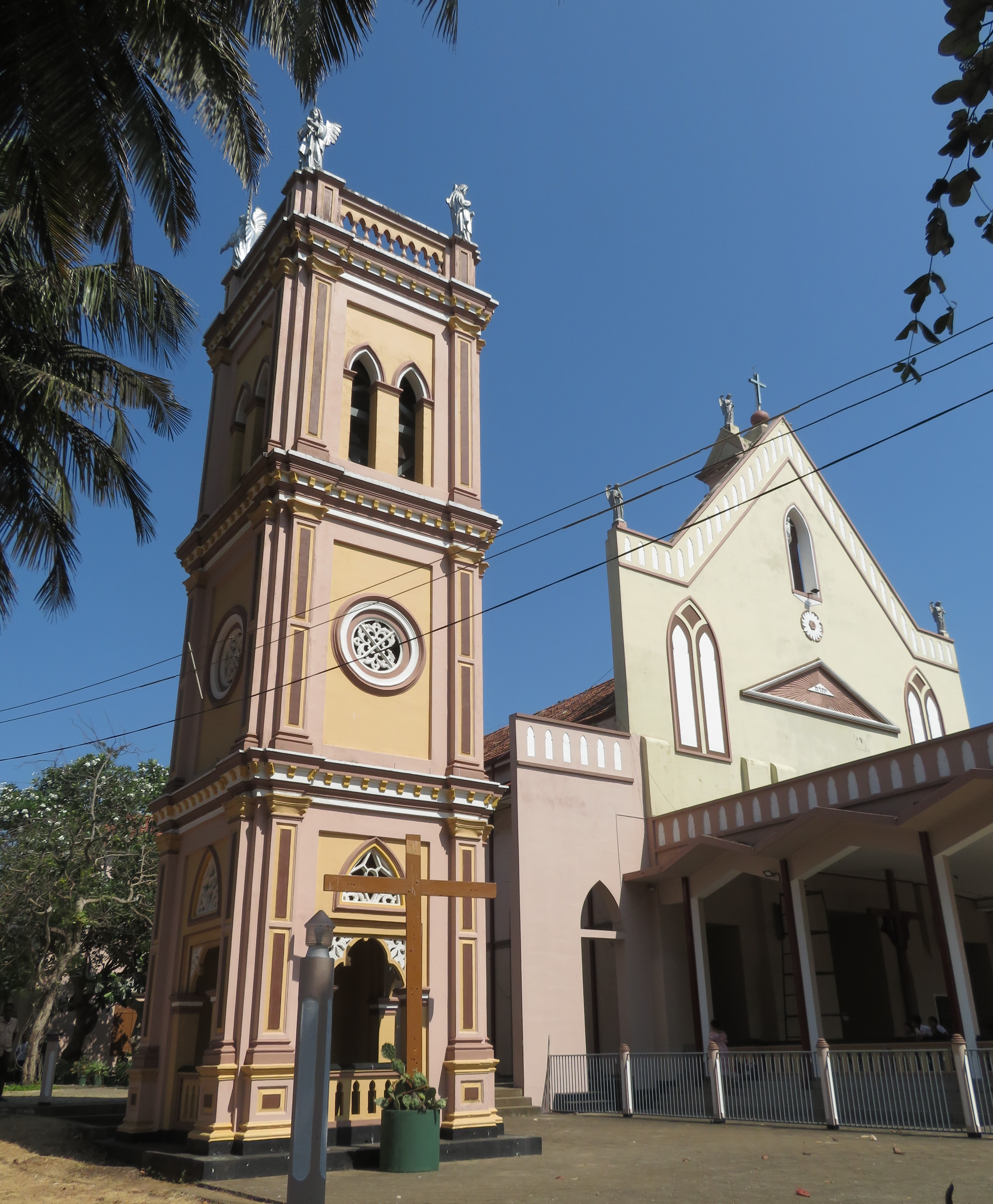
St. Mary's Cathedral, Chilaw

== Ordinaries ==
- Louis Perera, O.M.I. † (5 Jan 1939 Appointed - 8 Apr 1939 Died)
- Edmund Peiris, O.M.I. † (12 Jan 1940 Appointed - 27 Dec 1972 Resigned)
- Frank Marcus Fernando, † (27 Dec 1972 Succeeded - 19 Oct 2006 Retired)
- Valence Mendis, (19 Oct 2006 Succeeded - 9 Oct 2021 Appointed, Bishop of Kandy)

== See also ==
- Catholic Church in Sri Lanka
