= Diocese of Anuradhapura =

Roman Catholic diocese in Sri Lanka

Coordinates: 8.3215°N 80.4114°E

Diocese of Anuradhapura Dioecesis Anuradhapurensis அநுராதபுரம் மாவட்ட

Location
- Country: Sri Lanka
- Ecclesiastical province: Colombo
- Metropolitan: Colombo

Statistics
- Area: 10,727 km^{2} (4,142 sq mi)
- Population: Total; Catholics: (as of 2012); 1,110,904; 12,703 (1.1%)

Information
- Denomination: Catholic Church
- Sui iuris church: Latin Church
- Rite: Roman Rite
- Cathedral: Cathedral of St Joseph in Anuradhapura
- Patron saint: Saint Joseph

Current leadership
- Pope: Leo XIV
- Bishop: Mohottige Don Nishantha Sagara Jayamanne, S.S.S.
- Metropolitan Archbishop: Malcolm Ranjith

The Diocese of Anuradhapura (Lat: Dioecesis Anuradhapurensis) is a diocese of the Latin Church of the Catholic Church in Sri Lanka.

Originally erected as the apostolic prefecture of Anuradhapura, the prefecture was created from territory in the Diocese of Jaffna and the Diocese of Trincomalee-Batticaloa.

The prefecture was elevated to a full diocese in 1982, and is a suffragan to the Archdiocese of Colombo.

Norbert Marshall Andradi, appointed in 2003, is the bishop.

St. Joseph's Cathedral, possibly the oldest church in Sri Lanka, was founded by the Portuguese missionary Pedro de la Fonseca in 1544. The present building dates from 1845.

== Ordinaries ==
- Henry Swithin Thomas Alexander Wijetunge Goonewardena, O.M.I. † (20 Dec 1975 Appointed - 2 Nov 1995 Resigned)
- Oswald Thomas Colman Gomis (2 Nov 1995 Appointed - 6 Jul 2002 Appointed, Archbishop of Colombo)
- Norbert Marshall Andradi, O.M.I. (14 Nov 2003 Appointed - )

== See also ==
- Catholic Church in Sri Lanka
