= Manglieu =

- Commune
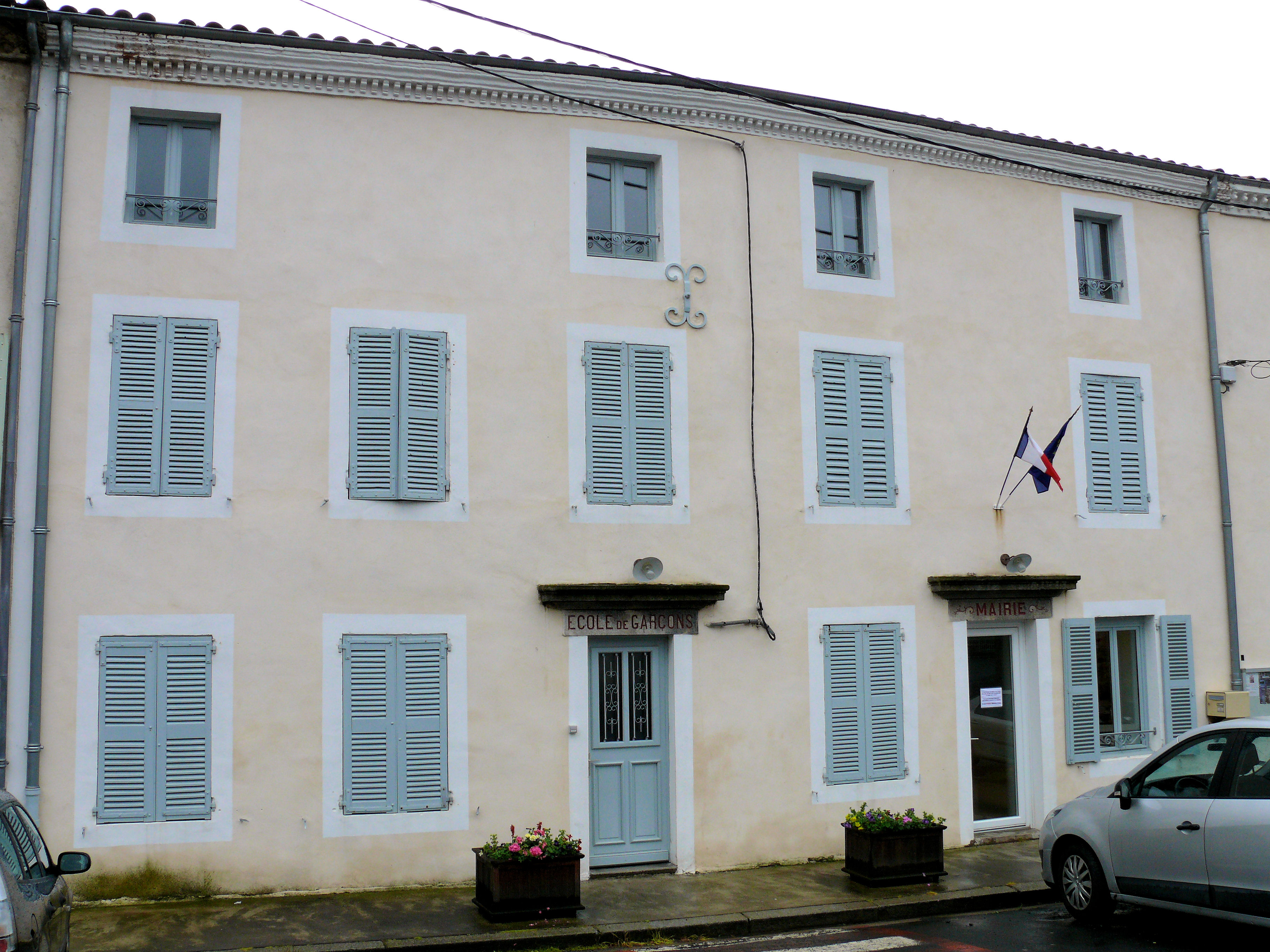
- The town hall and school in Manglieu
- Location of Manglieu
- Location within France Location within Auvergne-Rhône-Alpes
- Coordinates: 45°36′43″N 3°21′06″E
- Country: France
- Region: Auvergne-Rhône-Alpes
- Department: Puy-de-Dôme
- Arrondissement: Clermont-Ferrand
- Canton: Vic-le-Comte

Government
  - Mayor (2026–32): Michèle Brousse
- Area^{1}: 21.09 km^{2} (8.14 sq mi)
- Elevation: 430 m (1,410 ft)
- Highest elevation: 646 m (2,119 ft)
- Lowest elevation: 399 m (1,309 ft)
- Population (2023): 467
  - Density: 22.1/km^{2} (57.4/sq mi)
- Time zone: UTC+01:00 (CET)
  - Summer (DST): UTC+02:00 (CEST)
- INSEE/Postal code: 63205 /63270
- ^{1} French Land Register data, which excludes lakes, ponds, glaciers > 1 km^{2} (0.386 sq mi or 247 acres) and river estuaries.

Manglieu (French pronunciation: [mɑ̃ljø]; Occitan: Manluòc) is a commune in the Puy-de-Dôme department in Auvergne in central France.

== See also ==
- Communes of the Puy-de-Dôme department
