= Statue of Our Lady of Miracles, Jaffna patao =

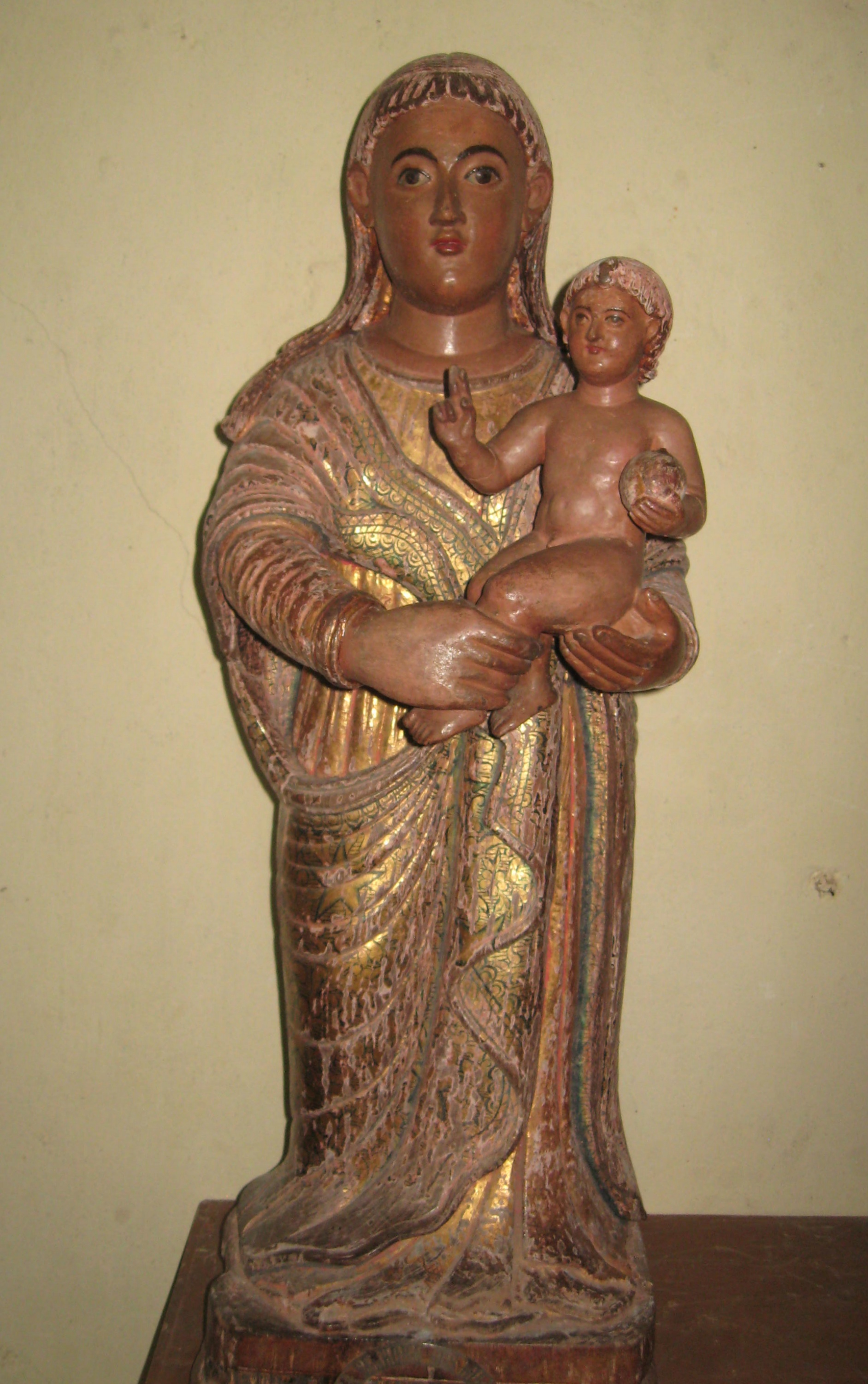
The statue of Our Lady of Miracles, Jaffna patao

The statue of Our Lady of Miracles, Jaffna Patão, is a wooden sculpture now preserved in the Church of São Pedro in Bainguinim, Goa, India.

== History ==
In 1614, Friar Francisco de S. Antonio, who was the Rector of Our Lady of Victory, Jaffnapatao (Nossa Senhora da Vitória, Jafanapatão), desired a statue for the church altar. He asked a local sculptor named Annacutti to carve one from a piece of wood he had brought from Cochin. As Annacutti was carving the statue of the Virgin Mary holding her infant son, it began to be regarded as miraculous. People visited Annacutti's house to pray before the statue, with many reporting cures. Even those who prayed while holding wood shavings from the statue experienced healing through the intercession of the Virgin Mary. Some who showed disrespect toward the statue reportedly faced the wrath of God. Witnessing these miracles, Annacutti was both amazed and frightened; he dared not continue and asked the friar to take the unfinished statue to the church. On 24 July 1614, the statue was taken in a public procession from the sculptor’s house to the church. As the procession passed by the royal palaces, the king and royal family appeared to witness it. The statue was then placed on an altar in the center of the church.

Due to the numerous miracles attributed to the statue, it became known as Our Lady of Miracles (புதுமை மாதா / Puthumai Matha), Jaffnapatao. People from other parts of Ceylon, as well as neighbouring regions such as Santhome and Nagapattinam, went on pilgrimages to visit Our Lady of Miracles.
