= Catholic Bishops' Conference of Sri Lanka =

Assembly of Catholic bishops

The Catholic Bishops' Conference of Sri Lanka is the episcopal conference of Sri Lanka. As of June 2022 the president of the Catholic Bishops' Conference of Sri Lanka is Bishop Harold Anthony Perera, the bishop of Roman Catholic Diocese of Kurunegala. The secretary general of the bishops conference is Bishop J.D. Anthony, auxiliary bishop of Colombo. The conference is an incorporated entity in Sri Lanka.

== See also ==
- Roman Catholicism in Sri Lanka
- Christianity in Sri Lanka
