= St. Mary's Cathedral, Jaffna =

Roman Catholic cathedral in Jaffna, Sri Lanka

St. Mary's Cathedral
- Jaffna Cathedral
- புனித மரியன்னை பேராலயம்
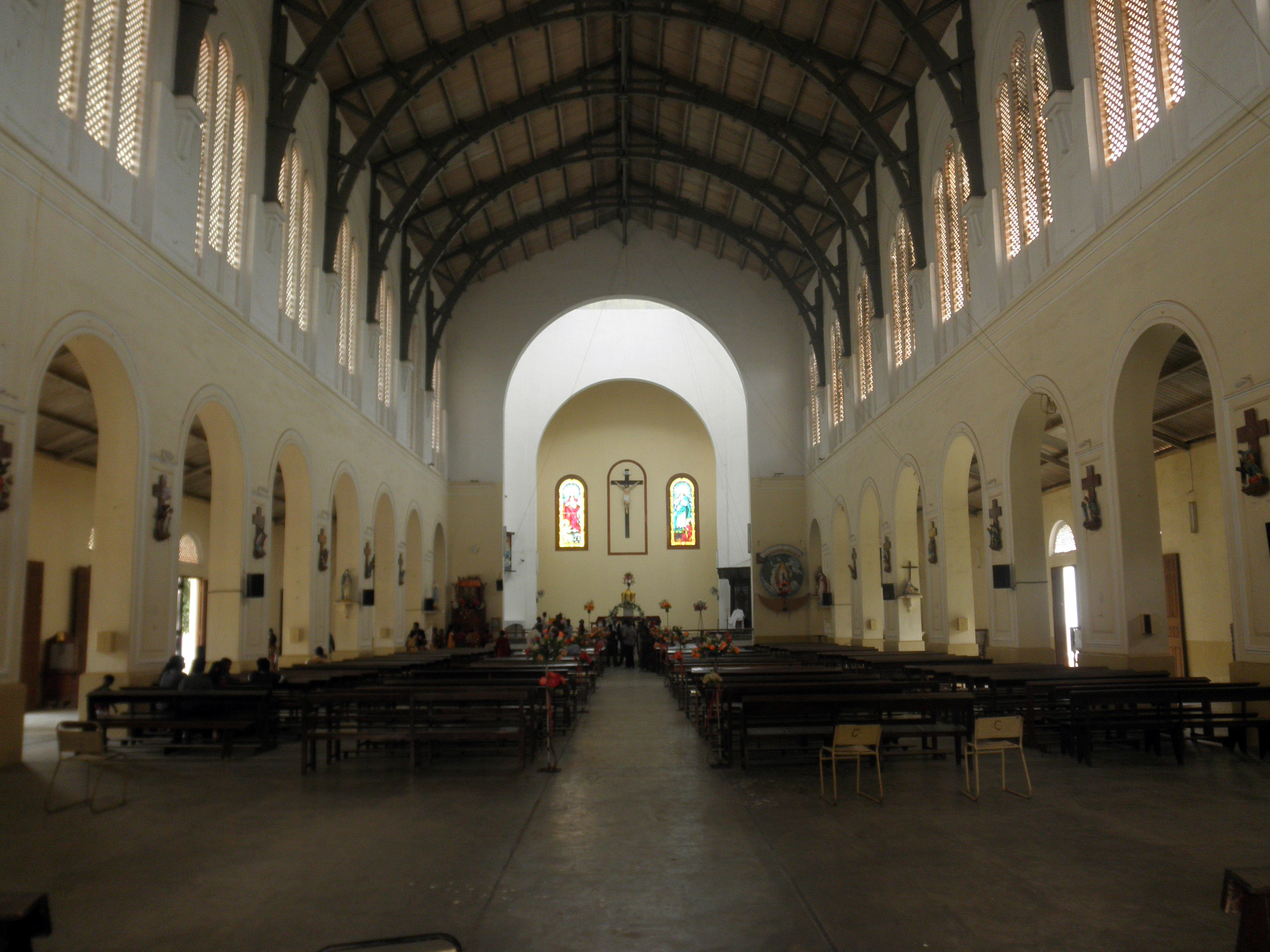

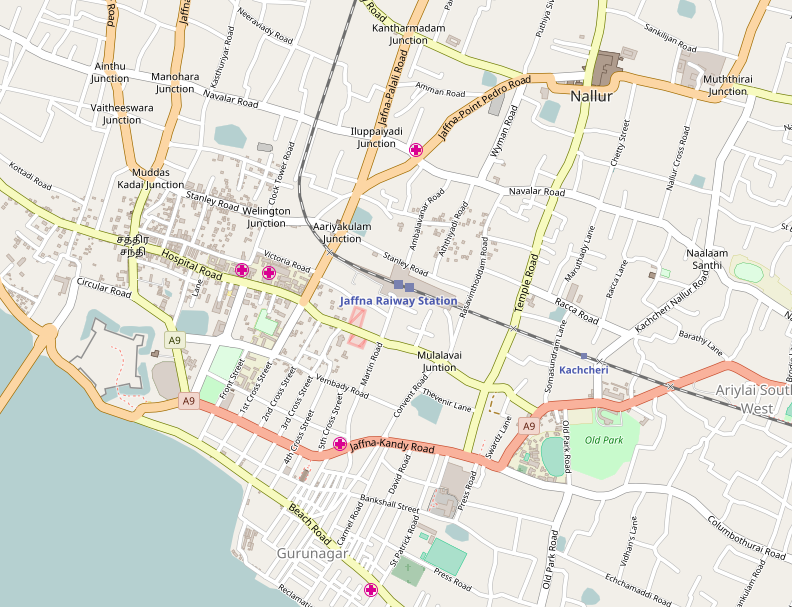
- Location in central Jaffna
- 09°39′22.10″N 80°01′21.90″E
- Location: Gurunagar, Jaffna
- Country: Sri Lanka
- Denomination: Roman Catholic

History
- Former name: St. Mary's Church
- Status: Cathedral

Architecture
- Functional status: Active
- Groundbreaking: 1789; 237 years ago
- Completed: 1794

Administration
- Archdiocese: Colombo
- Diocese: Jaffna

Clergy
- Bishop: Justin Bernard Gnanapragasam
- Priest: Rev. Fr.John Mavulis

St. Mary's Cathedral (Tamil: புனித மரியன்னை பேராலயம், romanized: Puṉita Mariyaṉṉai Pērālayam; Sinhala: ශාන්ත මරියා ආසන දෙව් මැදුර Śānta Mariyā Āsana Dev Mædura) is the seat of the Roman Catholic Diocese of Jaffna located in Gurunagar, a suburb of Jaffna in northern Sri Lanka.

The cathedral is also known locally as Periye Kovil (Tamil: பெரிய கோவில்).

== History ==
According to historical sources, King of Jaffna Cankili I killed his son at the location of the present cathedral after his son converted to Catholicism. The prince's ashes were buried at the spot where he was killed and a chapel, which later served as the foundation for the construction of the present cathedral, was built.

Construction of St. Mary's Church began in 1789 and was completed in 1794. The first parish priest was Rev. Fr. Leonard Rebeiro. The church was built on the site of a thatched house that had previously served as a worshipping place for Jaffna's Catholics. The church has a total of fourteen novenas. The ancestors of the 10th and 11th novena gifted land for the church and the ancestors of the 12th and 13th novenas gifted land and also contributed with money for purchasing land for the church.

By the early twentieth century the church, which was now a cathedral, had become too small to accommodate all its worshippers. Construction of a new cathedral began in 1939 but wasn't completed until 1975.
