= André-Théophile Mélizan =

Catholic Archbishop (1844-1905)

His Grace, the Most Rev. André-Théophile Mélizan OMI
- Archbishop, Archdiocese of Colombo
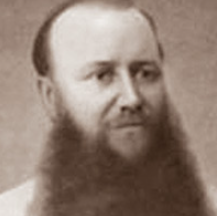
- Installed: 5 March 1893
- Term ended: 27 June 1905
- Predecessor: Christophe-Etienne Bonjean
- Successor: Antoine Coudert
- Other posts: Coadjutor Vicar Apostolic, Jaffna (1879-1883), Titular Bishop of Adrana (1883-1886) Bishop of Jaffna (1886-1893).

Orders
- Ordination: 19 October 1868 as Priest, and 8 August 1879 as Coadjutor Vicar Apostolic of Jaffna, and Titular Bishop of Adrana, and 1 September 1886 as Bishop of Jaffna.
- Consecration: 5 March 1893 as Archbishop of Colombo

Personal details
- Born: 27 May 1844 Marseille
- Died: 27 June 1905 (aged 61)
- Denomination: Roman Catholic

André-Théophile Mélizan (27 May 1844 – 27 June 1905) was a French Catholic missionary, priest and bishop, who served as the second Archbishop of Colombo, Ceylon from 1893 to 1905.

== Biography ==
André-Théophile Mélizan was born on 27 May 1844 in Marseille, France, son of M. Melizan, vice-consul of Italy. In 1862, he entered the Missionary Oblates of Mary Immaculate as a novice and after completing his theological studies was ordained as a priest on 19 October 1868.

In 1868, he left France for Jaffna, Ceylon accompanied by Christophe Bonjean the newly appointed Vicar Apostolic of Jaffna, and was put in charge of the mission at Valikamam. In 1871, he was transferred to the mission at Mullaitivu where he spent three years before he returned to Jaffna where he organised printing of Catholic publications.

In 1875, he took charge of the mission of Kalpitya which included the church and pilgrimage site of St Anne at Thalawila where 20-30,000 pilgrims attended that year. His father sent him a large bell from France which he installed in St Anne's church. From 1879 to 1883, he served as Coadjutor Vicar Apostolic of Jaffna, having been ordained Titular Bishop of Adrana in 1879.

In 1883, when Bonjean, Vicar-Apostolic of Jaffna was transferred to Colombo, he succeeded to that position, and in 1886, was elevated to Bishop as the first Bishop of Jaffna. On 5 March 1893, after the death of Archbishop Bonjean, he succeeded him becoming the second Archbishop of Colombo. He established many schools including St Joseph's College, Colombo, the Holy Convent, Colombo, and St Bridget's Convent, Colombo. He died on 27 June 1905.
