= Roman Catholic Diocese of Kandy =

Latin Catholic diocese in Sri Lanka

Coordinates: 7.2979°N 80.6362°E

Diocese of Kandy Dioecesis Kandiensis கண்டி மாவட்ட

Location
- Country: Sri Lanka
- Ecclesiastical province: Colombo
- Metropolitan: Colombo

Statistics
- Area: 5,753 km^{2} (2,221 sq mi)
- Population: Total; Catholics: (as of 2011); 2,690,430; 84,830 (3.2%)
- Schools: St. Anthony's College, Kandy, Good shepherd convent, kandy

Information
- Denomination: Catholic Church
- Sui iuris church: Latin Church
- Rite: Roman Rite
- Cathedral: Cathedral of St Anthony in Kandy

Current leadership
- Pope: Leo XIV
- Bishop: Valence Mendis
- Metropolitan Archbishop: Malcolm Ranjith
- Vicar General: Very Rev. Fr.Alvin Peter Fernando
- Judicial Vicar: Rev. Fr.Colvin Fernandopulle
- Bishops emeritus: Joseph Vianney Fernando

Website
- Website of the Diocese

The Diocese of Kandy (Lat: Dioecesis Kandiensis) is a suffragan diocese of the Latin Church of the Catholic Church in the ecclesiastical province (covering all Sri Lanka) of the Metropolitan Archbishopric of Colombo, but depends on the missionary Congregation for the Evangelization of Peoples.

The episcopal seat is St. Anthony’s Cathedral, in Kandy. The current bishop is Valence Mendis, appointed in 2021.

== Statistics ==
As of 2014, it pastorally served 81,293 Catholics (3.2% of 2,578,000 total) on 5,733 km^{2} in 27 parishes and 2 missions with 51 priests (39 diocesan, 12 religious), 329 lay religious (149 brothers, 180 sisters) and 15 seminarians.

== History ==
- Originally erected on 20 April 1883 as the Apostolic Vicariate of Kandy, on territory split off from the then diocese of Colombo (soon promoted Archdiocese of Colombo, now its Metropolitan)
- Promoted to Diocese of Kandy on 1 September 1886, as a suffragan of the simultaneously elevated Archdiocese of Colombo.
- On 18 December 1972, part of the diocese was split off to form the Diocese of Badulla.
- The diocese invited the Comboni Missionary Sisters to establish a missionary presence in Talawakelle in 2012 to support the education of the local Tamil people.

== Episcopal ordinaries ==
Apostolic Vicars of Kandy

- Clemente Pagnani, Sylvestrines (O.S.B.Silv.) (20 April 1883 Appointed - 1 September 1886), Titular Bishop of Hephæstum (1879.11.12 – 1886.09.01), first as Bishop of Colombo (Sri Lanka) (1879.11.12 – 1883.04.20)

Bishops of Kandy

- Clemente Pagnani, O.S.B.Silv. (1 September 1886 - death June 1911)
- Bede Beekmeyer, O.S.B.Silv. (19 April 1912 - death 22 May 1935)
- Bernardo Regno, O.S.B.Silv. (27 January 1936 - retired 24 September 1958), stayed on a while as Apostolic Administrator of Kandy (1958.09.24 – 1959.07.02), during emeritate as Titular Bishop of Bagai (1958.09.24 – 1971.01.26), died 1977
- Leo Nanayakkara, O.S.B.Silv. (2 July 1959 - 18 December 1972), next Bishop of Badulla (1972.12.18 – death 1982.05.28)
- Appasinghe Paul Perera (17 May 1973 - death 16 May 1989)
- Joseph Vianney Fernando (17 March 1983 - 9 October 2021), also President of Bishops' Conference of Sri Lanka (1995 – 1998 and 2004.04 – 2010.04)
- Valence Mendis (9 October 2021 – present)

== See also ==
- List of Catholic dioceses in Sri Lanka and the Maldives
- Catholic Church in Sri Lanka

== Sources and external links ==
- GCatholic, with Goggle satellite photo - data for all sections
- Catholic Encyclopedia: Diocese of Kandy
