= Diocese of Jaffna (Catholic) =

Roman Catholic diocese in Sri Lanka

Coordinates: 9.6562°N 80.0222°E

Diocese of Jaffna Dioecesis Jaffnensis யாழ்ப்பாண மறை மாவட்டம்
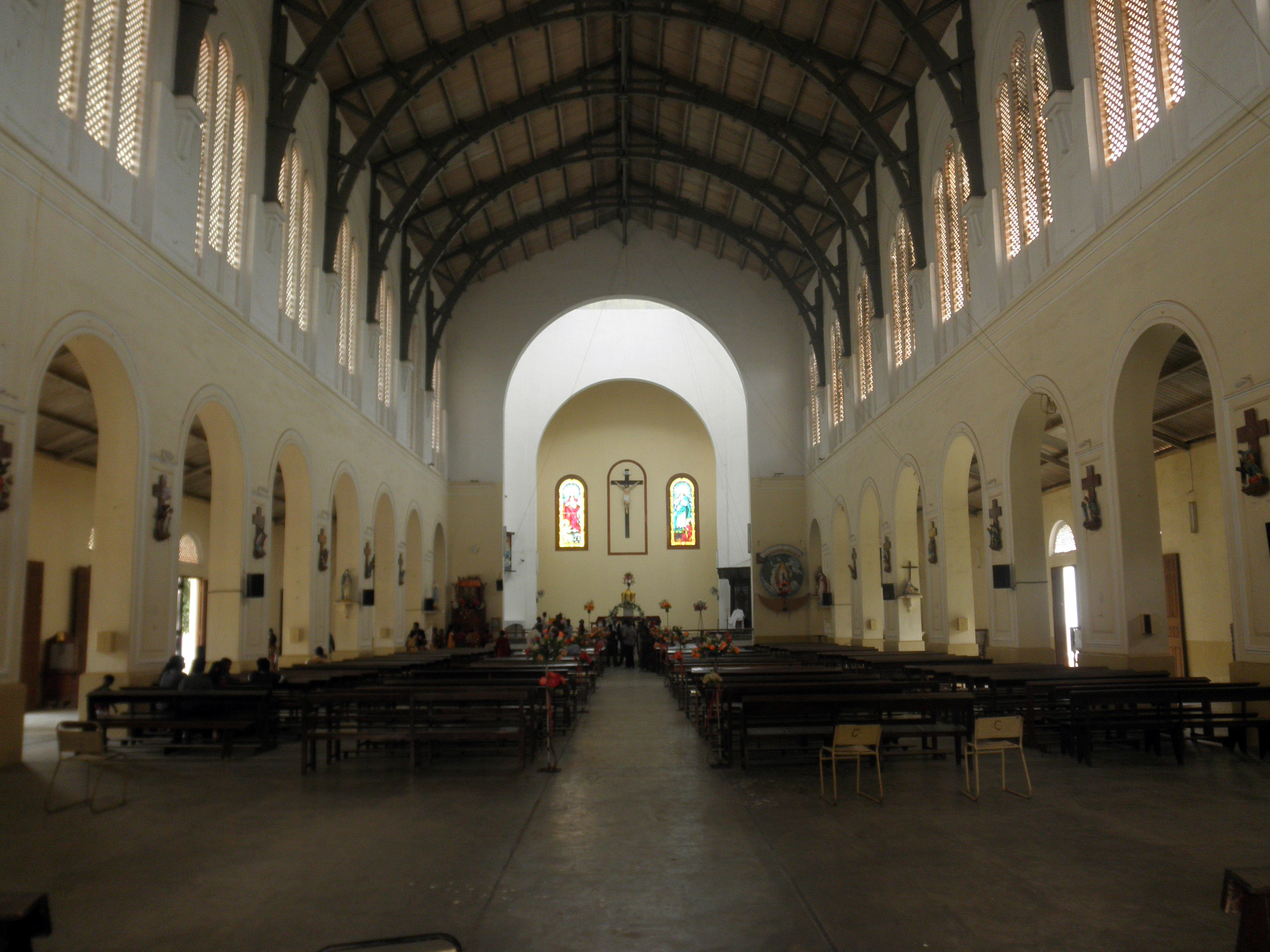
- Interior of St. Mary's Cathedral, Jaffna

Location
- Country: Sri Lanka
- Ecclesiastical province: Colombo
- Metropolitan: Colombo

Statistics
- Area: 4,400 km^{2} (1,700 sq mi)
- Population: 247,315
- Parishes: 59

Information
- Denomination: Catholic
- Sui iuris church: Latin Church
- Rite: Roman Rite
- Established: 17 February 1845
- Cathedral: St. Mary's Cathedral, Jaffna
- Secular priests: 162

Current leadership
- Pope: Leo XIV
- Bishop: Anton Ranjith Pillainayagam
- Metropolitan Archbishop: Malcolm Ranjith

Website
- jaffnadiocese.org

The Diocese of Jaffna (Latin: Dioecesis Jaffnensis) is a Latin Church ecclesiastical territory or diocese of the Catholic Church in northern Sri Lanka. Latin Catholicism in the diocese's territory dates to the time of Francis Xavier. AS of 2026 the current bishop is Anton Ranjith Pillainayagam who assumed office on 26 August.

== History ==
The Apostolic Vicariate of Jaffna was created on 17 February 1845 from the Diocese of Ceylon. On 1 September 1886, it was promoted to a diocese. On 25 August 1893, parts of diocese were transferred to newly created Diocese of Trincomalee. On 19 December 1975, parts of the diocese were transferred to the newly created Apostolic Prefecture of Anuradhapura. On 24 January 1981, parts of the diocese were transferred to the newly created Diocese of Mannar.

=== Origins ===
In 1548, Francis Xavier visited Mannar and came to Jaffna to persuade the king to cease his persecutions against the Christians.

In 1580, under the protection of the Portuguese, the first Catholic church was built at Jaffna. The whole peninsula having surrendered in 1591 to André Furtado de Mendonça, almost the entire population embraced Christianity. When the fort of Jaffna capitulated to the Dutch in 1658 there were in the peninsula 50 priests, 1 Jesuit college, 1 Franciscan and 1 Dominican convent, and 14 churches. For safety the famous miraculous Statue of Our Lady of Miracles, Jaffna patao ( புதுமை மாதா / Puthumai Matha 1614-1658) was smuggled out of the island by Portuguese prisoners. Since 1658, the statue has been kept in the church of Sao Pedro situated along the Mandovi river in Bainguinim, Goa, India.

=== Dutch period ===
The Dutch immediately manifested the most hostile disposition towards the Catholics. The priests and monks were banished, and giving them shelter was declared a capital offence. From that time dates the long persecution which ended only with the surrender of Ceylon to the British in 1796. To this diocese belongs the Island of Mannar rendered famous by the apostolic labours of Francis Xavier and by the martyrdom of 600 to 700 Christians, executed by order of the King of Jaffna. Madhu, though a solitary spot in the middle of the jungle, has also its historical fame. For a long time during the Dutch persecution it was the refuge of native Christians. To this spot they had transported a statue of Our Lady which is enshrined in the new church. More than 40,000 pilgrims congregate at Madhu every year for the feast of the Visitation.

=== British period ===
In 1845, Ceylon was divided into the two vicariates of Colombo and Jaffna, with Bishop Orazio Bettachini as vicar Apostolic of the latter. In 1847, the Oblates of Mary Immaculate arrived in Ceylon. In 1857 the Jaffna vicariate was handed over to the oblates, and on the death of Bishop Bettachini, Bishop Semeria was appointed vicar Apostolic. In 1868 Bishop Christophe Ernest Bonjean succeeded Semeria. He had been in the missions for nine years in India and in 1856 had crossed over to Ceylon to join the oblates. During his administration a great impulse was given to primary education. The effects of the Protestant and Hindu schools were more than counterbalanced by the activity of the bishop and the missionaries. Subsequently Bonjean was transferred to the metropolitan see of Colombo. Bishop Theophile Melirzan succeeded him at Jaffna and, following in his footsteps, was named Archbishop of Colombo in 1893. In the same year Henri Joulain was appointed Bishop of Jaffna.

=== 20th century ===
In the early twentieth century, the diocese had 45,500 Catholics out of a total population of 499,200. It was managed by 46 oblate missionaries, with three secular priests helping in the parochial ministry.

Attached to the cathedral is St. Martin's seminary for the education of junior students aspiring to the priesthood. St. Patrick's college and boarding school is the most flourishing institution of the northern province. It has a staff of 6 European fathers, 1 native father, 2 brothers, and 15 native professors. The average number of students is 450. It is especially devoted to higher English education, and prepares its students for the Cambridge Junior and Senior examinations and for the London University Intermediate.

Some years ago it was thought expedient to come into closer contact with non-Catholics and especially with the higher classes of Hindus. For this purpose a Hindu boarding school was attached to St. Patrick's College. The boarders number 100, with good prospects for the future. Jaffna convent, conducted by the Sisters of the Holy Family of Bordeaux, follows the same junior and senior courses, for the education of girls, as St. Patrick's. To the convent is attached a girls' orphanage.

The native Brothers of St. Joseph are occupied in teaching at Jaffna, Kayts, Mannar and Mullaitivu. The native Sisters of St. Peter conduct primary schools in all the important stations of the diocese. There are 127 schools under the control of the missionaries, for the vernacular and primary English education. At the two industrial schools of Colombogam and Mullaitivu 125 orphan boys are taught agriculture and useful trades.

The diocese has conferences of St. Vincent de Paul and young men's associations for the working classes. St. Joseph's Catholic Press is the home of the Jaffna Catholic Guardian, a weekly paper devoted to the interests of the diocese. A Catholic Club has just been founded for the purpose of interests of the Catholic community.

== Bishops, vicars apostolics and pro-vicar apostolics ==
#	Pro-vicar apostolic	Took office	Left office
1st	Orazio Bettacchini	1847	1849

#	Vicar apostolic	Took office	Left office
1st	Orazio Bettacchini	1849	1857
2nd	Jean-Etienne Sémeria	1857	1868
3rd	Christophe-Etienne Bonjean	1868	1883
4th	André-Théophile Mélizan	1883	1886

#	Bishop	Took office	Left office
1st	André-Théophile Mélizan	1886	1893
2nd	Henri Joulain	1893	1919
3rd	Jules-André Brault	1919	1923
4th	Alfred-Jean Guyomard	1924	1950
5th	Jerome Emilianuspillai	1950	1972
6th	Bastiampillai Deogupillai	1972	1992
7th	Thomas Savundaranayagam	1992	2015
8th	Justin Gnanapragasam	2015	

== Other officials ==
- Vicar General: Pathinathan Josephdas Jebaratnam
- Chancellor: S.V.B Mangalarajah
- Judicial Vicar: T.J Kirubakaran
- Financial Administrator: S. Nesanayagam

== Activities and organizations ==
=== Spiritual centers ===
- Divine retreat center, Jaffna
- Sangamam, Kopy

=== Catholic educational institutions ===
- St. Patrick's College, Jaffna
- St. Don Bosco School
- St. Henry's College, Illavalai.
- St. Antony's College, Kayts.

=== Major Catholic organizations ===
- Caritas- Hudec
- Catechetical Center
- Ahavoli
- Commission for Justice and Peace

== Notable churches ==
- St. Mary's Cathedral, Jaffna
- Our Lady of Refuge, Jaffna
- St. Antony's Church, Jaffna
- St. James Church, Gurunagar, Jaffna
- Our Lady of Miracle, Gurunagar, Jaffna
- St. Sebastian Church, Gurunagar, Jaffna
- Our Lady of Velankani, Gurunagar, Jaffna
- St. Roche Church, Gurunagar, Jaffna
- Christ the King Church, Koiyathottam, Jaffna
- St. John's Church, Jaffna
- St. Theresa Church, Jaffna
- Our Lady of Rosary, Jaffna
- Infant Jesus Church, Jaffna
- St. Joseph Church, Jaffna
- St. Anne's Church, Jaffna
- St. Benedict's Church, Nallur
- St. Jude Church, Ariyalai
- Mount Carmel Church, Gurunagar
- Holy Redeemer Church, Maniyanthottam
- St. Nichlos Church, Navanturai
- St. Antony's Church, Manipay
- Our Lady of Fatima, Pandatheripu
- Kathirai Madha Church, Sillalai
- Our Lady of Lourdes, Point Pedro
- St. Thomas Church, Point Pedro
- Our Lady of Velankani, Point Pedro
- St. Joseph Church, Point Pedro
- St. Antony's Church, Nelliady
- St. Peter's Church, Navaly
- St. Joseph Church, Atchuvely
- St. Antony's Church, Atchuvely
- Mount Carmel Church, Vasavilan
- St. James Church, Vasavilan
- St. Antony's Church, Kayts
- St. Peter's Church, Kayts
- St. Thomas Church, Kayts
- St. Mary's Church, Kayts
- Holy Family Church, Uduvil
- St. Michel's Church, Urumpirai
- St. Theresa Church, Kilinocchi
- St. Jude Church, Kanagapuram
- Fatima Church, Uruthirapuram
- St. Antony's Church, Thondaman Nagar
- St. Peter's Church, Mullaitiv
- Our Lady of Velankani, Nachikuda

== Religious congregations ==
=== Religious institutes of men ===
- Oblate of Mary Immaculate
- Rosarians
- Sons of the Immaculate Heart of the Blessed Virgin Mary (Claretians)
- De Monfort Brothers

=== Religious institutes of women ===
- Sisters of Holy Family
- Sisters of Holy Cross
- Sisters of Apostolic Carmel
- Rosarian Sisters
- Mother Teresa Sisters
- Sisters of St. Joseph Cluny
