= Christophe Ernest Bonjean =

French Catholic Archbishop (1823–1892)

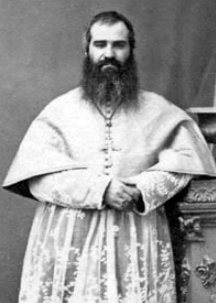
- Church: Roman Catholic
- Archdiocese: Colombo, Ceylon
- Installed: 25 November 1886
- Retired: 1892
- Predecessor: Office newly created
- Successor: André Mélizan

Orders
- Ordination: 11 December 1846 as Priest and 24 August 1868 as Bishop
- Consecration: 25 November 1886 as Archbishop of Colombo by Archbishop Joseph Hippolyte Guibert

Personal details
- Born: 21 September 1823 Riom, France
- Died: 3 August 1892 (aged 68) Colombo

Christophe Ernest Bonjean (21 September 1823 – 3 August 1892) was a French Catholic missionary and priest who became the first Archbishop of Colombo, Ceylon in 1886.

== Early life and education ==
Bonjean was born on 21 September 1823 in Riom, France. In 1846, he was ordained as a priest of the Catholic missionaries, Oblates of Mary Immaculate, and in the following year was sent to India.

== Career ==
After beginning his missionary work in India in 1847, Bonjean went to Jaffna, Ceylon in 1856 and joined there the Oblates mission. On 24 July 1868, he was appointed Vicar Apostolic of Jaffna, and Titular Bishop of Medea, and was ordained on 24 August 1868.

In 1883, he was transferred from Jaffna to Colombo after the Southern Vicariate was divided in two with the Benedictines retaining the Diocese of Kandy and the Diocese of Colombo being given to the Oblates. On 1 September 1886, the Diocese of Colombo was elevated to an Archdiocese, and on 25 November 1886, he was appointed the first Archbishop of Colombo.

Known for his educational reforms, Bonjean was regarded as "the father of the denominational school system". During the 1860s, he proposed to the government the establishment of schools administered by the main religious faiths: Christian, Buddhist, Muslim and Hindu, with each entitled to state aid. He fought for equal treatment of all schools and thanks to his efforts, in 1869, the government decided that any religious denomination could open schools for its children, and that a grant would be provided.

Bonjean also recognised the need to improve education to prepare students for employment in the professions and in government. In 1892, he prepared plans for the establishment of a college for higher education which became St. Joseph's College, Colombo when it opened in 1896 with over 300 pupils. He opened a number of elementary schools both English and Tamil. Recognising the need for more priests and missionaries he also founded the St Bernard's Ecclesiastical Seminary in Borella.

In 1892, Bonjean retired as Archbishop due to poor health, and died in Colombo on 3 August 1892.
