= Karampon =

Karampon கரம்பொன் කරමිපෝන්
- Village
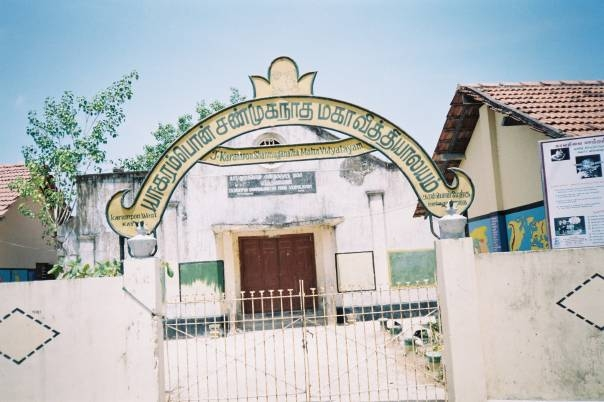

- Location within Northern Province
- Coordinates: 9°40′0″N 79°52′0″E
- Country: Sri Lanka
- Province: Northern
- District: Jaffna

Karampon (also known as Karampan) (Tamil: கரம்பொன்) is a village located in Kayts, Velanai Island, off the Jaffna Peninsula, Northern Sri Lanka.

The majority of the people are Hindus along with a minority of Christians. There are a number of Hindu temples, a few churches and around a dozen schools in the village.

== Education ==
- Little Flower Convent, Karampon
- Shanmuganatha Vidyalayam, Karampon
