= Velanai Island =

Velanai Island வேலணைத் தீவு
- Island
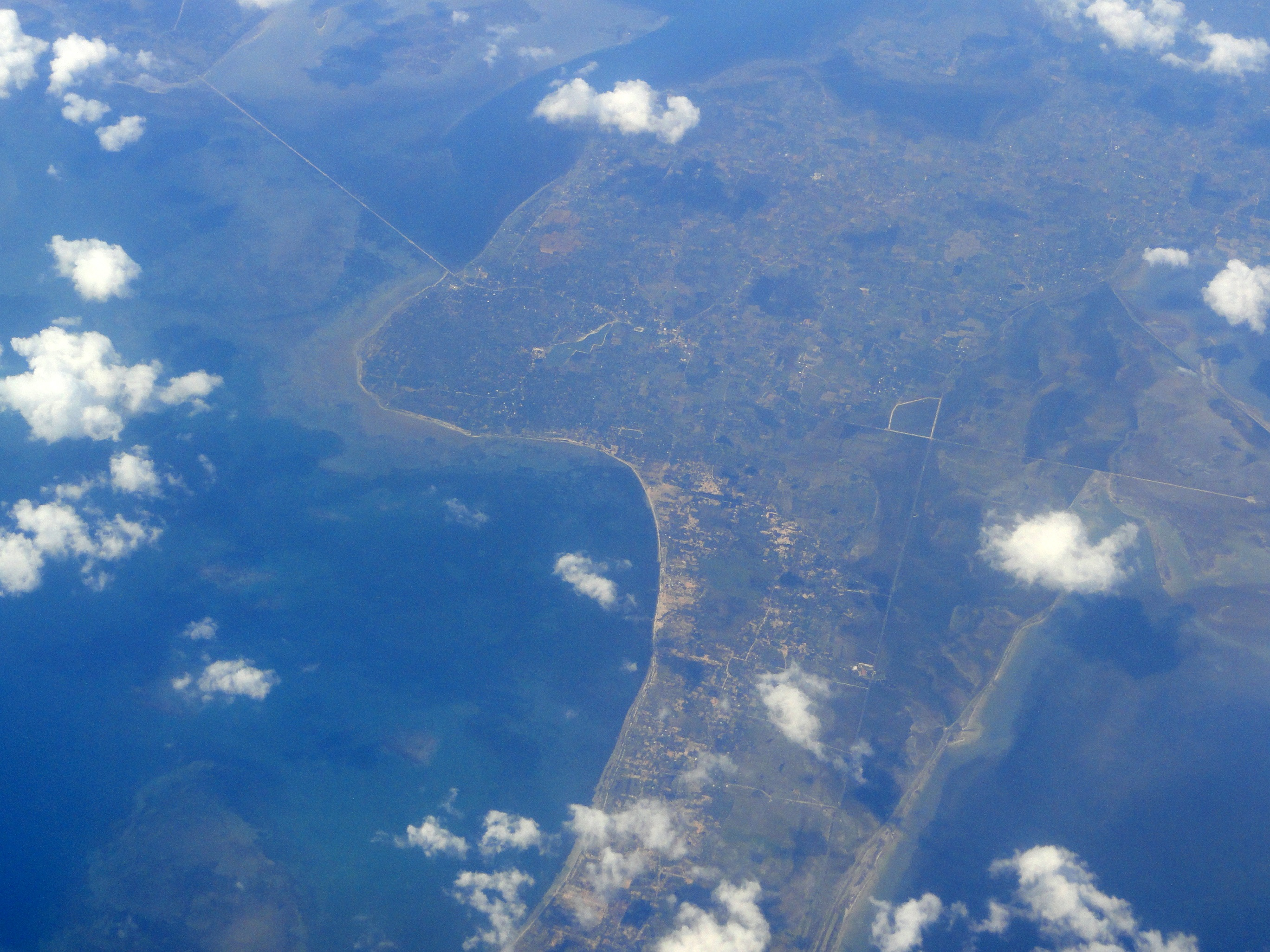
- Aerial view of the Velanai Island.

- Location within Northern Province Location within Sri Lanka
- Coordinates: 9°40′0″N 79°52′0″E
- Country: Sri Lanka
- Province: Northern
- District: Jaffna

Velanai Island (Tamil: வேலணை, Velanaitivu), also known as Leiden in Dutch, or Kayts Island, is a small island off the coast of the Jaffna Peninsula in the north of Sri Lanka.

The majority of the island's inhabitants are Hindus, along with a sizeable minority of Christians. There are a number of Hindu temples along with a few churches on the island. The most famous is the Sinna Madhu Matha Shrine, built by the Portuguese in 1544. It was later destroyed and the current church dates from 1928. Sir Vaithilingam Duraiswamy, a member of the State Council of Ceylon during the British colonial period, and his son Yogendra Duraiswamy, a Sri Lankan diplomat, were both born in Velanai.

== Etymology ==
The name Velanai is believed to have been derived from the name of the Tamil god Velan (Tamil: வேலன்). The goddess Parvathi gave a pointed spear (vel) to her son, the god Murugan (Tamil: முருகன்) in Velanai.

== Geography and climate ==
Velani is located at 9.40°N 79.54°E. It is surrounded by the Palk Strait and lies 6 kilometres (3.7 mi) south-west of Jaffna town. Most of Velani district is a level plain and also has maximum elevation of 15 metres (49 ft) above sea level. The total area of this island is nearly 36 km^{2}.

There are a number of villages on the island, such as Allaipiddy, Mankumpan, Velanai, Saravanai, Puliyankoodal, Suruvil, Naranthanai, Kayts and Karampon.

== History ==
Velanai was marred by violence during the Sri Lankan Civil War, with the island being the main setting of the Allaipiddy massacre in 2006. In 1992, Major General Denzil Kobbekaduwa and Commodore Mohan Jayamaha were killed along with several senior officers when their Land Rover hit a landmine off Araly Point in Kayts.
