= Diocese of Kurunegala (Catholic) =

Latin Catholic diocese in Sri Lanka

Coordinates: 7.4877°N 80.3626°E

Diocese of Kurunegala Dioecesis Kurunegalaensis குருணாகல் மாவட்ட

Location
- Country: Sri Lanka
- Ecclesiastical province: Colombo
- Metropolitan: Colombo

Statistics
- Area: 4,763 km^{2} (1,839 sq mi)
- Population: Total; Catholics: (as of 2012); 1,618,465; 43,711 (2.7%)

Information
- Denomination: Catholic Church
- Sui iuris church: Latin Church
- Rite: Roman Rite
- Established: 15 May 1987
- Cathedral: Cathedral of St Anne in Kurunegala
- Patron saint: Saint Anne

Current leadership
- Pope: Leo XIV
- Bishop: Harold Anthony Perera
- Metropolitan Archbishop: Malcolm Ranjith

The Diocese of Kurunegala (Latin: Dioecesis Kurunegalaensis) is a diocese of the Latin Church of the Catholic Church in Sri Lanka.

Erected as the Diocese of Kurunegala in 1987, from territory in the Diocese of Chilaw, the diocese is suffragan to the Archdiocese of Colombo. It is coextensive with the Kurunegala District.

The current bishop is Harold Anthony Perera, who was appointed in 2009.

== Ordinaries ==
- Anthony Leopold Raymond Peiris (15 May 1987 Appointed - 14 May 2009 Resigned)
- Harold Anthony Perera (14 May 2009 Appointed – present)

== See also ==
- Catholic Church in Sri Lanka
