= Catholic Church in Sri Lanka =

Timeline and activity of the Catholic Church in Sri Lank

Sri Lankan Catholics
- Official Catholic Church flag. Include the Anuradhapura cross.

Total population
- 1,261,194 (2012)

Regions with significant populations
- Province
- Western: ▲637,729
- North Western: ▲278,755
- Northern: ▼162,849
- Central: ▲62,476
- Eastern: ▼46,792

Religions
- Catholicism

Languages
- Sinhala; Tamil; English

The Catholic Church in Sri Lanka is part of the worldwide Catholic Church, under the spiritual leadership of the pope in Rome. The country comes under the province of Colombo and is made up of 12 dioceses including one archdiocese. There are approximately 1.2 million Catholics in Sri Lanka representing around 6.1% of the total population (according to the 2012 census).

In 1995, at a ceremony in Colombo, Pope St. John Paul II beatified Father Joseph Vaz (originally, José Vaz), an early Goan missionary to the country, who is known as the Apostle of Sri Lanka. On 17 September 2014, Pope Francis approved the vote to have him declared a saint. Pope Francis canonized Father Joseph Vaz on Galle Face Green, in Colombo on 14 January 2015.

== Early history ==
Records of ancient travelers to Sri Lanka report that a separate area was allocated for Christians in the ancient capital Anuradhapura and there was a Christian chapel used by the Persian merchants who came to Ceylon in around the 5th century. The Persian cross excavated in Anuradhapura belonging to the 5th century and the decorative baptismal pond excavated near Vavuniya prove the presence of Christians in Sri Lanka during the early period of the Anuradhapura Kingdom. Two crosses excavated around Anuradhapura in 1913 are said to be identical to the cross at St Thomas Mount near Chennai.

== Modern history ==
On 15 November 1505 a Portuguese fleet commanded by Lourenço de Almeida, having been driven by a storm to the shores of Sri Lanka, landed in Colombo. With the permission of the king of Kotte, Dharma Parakramabahu IX, Almeida erected a trade station and a small chapel in Colombo. The chapel was dedicated to St Lawrence. Franciscan Friar Vicente, the chaplain of the fleet, celebrated Mass. This is the first record of a Catholic Mass on Sri Lankan soil. Over the next few centuries, Portuguese, Dutch, and Irish missionaries spread the religion in Sri Lanka, most notably on the western and northwestern coast, where in some places Catholics are half the population.

== 2019 Easter bombings ==
On 21 April 2019, Easter Sunday, three churches in Sri Lanka and three luxury hotels in the commercial capital, Colombo, were targeted in a series of coordinated Islamist terrorist suicide bombings. Later that day, there were smaller explosions at a housing complex in Dematagoda and a guest house in Dehiwala. A total of 269 people were killed, including at least 45 foreign nationals, three police officers, and eight bombers, and at least 500 were injured. The church bombings were carried out during Easter services in Negombo, Batticaloa and Colombo; the hotels that were bombed were the Shangri-La, Cinnamon Grand, Kingsbury and Tropical Inn. According to the State Intelligence Service, a second wave of attacks was planned, but was stopped as a result of government raids.

The attack deeply shook the Christian and Catholic community of Sri Lanka, and Cardinal Malcolm Ranjith spent the next years asking for clarity and answers regarding responsibility for the bombings, and justice for the victims. Ranjith has been very critical of the investigations, alleging possible collusion of the Government with the attackers, citing a Parliamentary Select Committee report to this effect.

The cardinal denies that the Church suffers persecution in Sri Lanka, saying there is a problem with human rights. "The Church is not under threat in Sri Lanka, but human rights are. In Sri Lanka, we are witnessing a struggle between the Sri Lankan population against the Government. The Government has mismanaged the economy and now we have many families without food. There is extreme poverty, and we want also to speak about this phenomenon so that the international community can help us, and not support this type of dictatorial government that does not respect human rights".

== Important churches ==
=== Cathedral ===
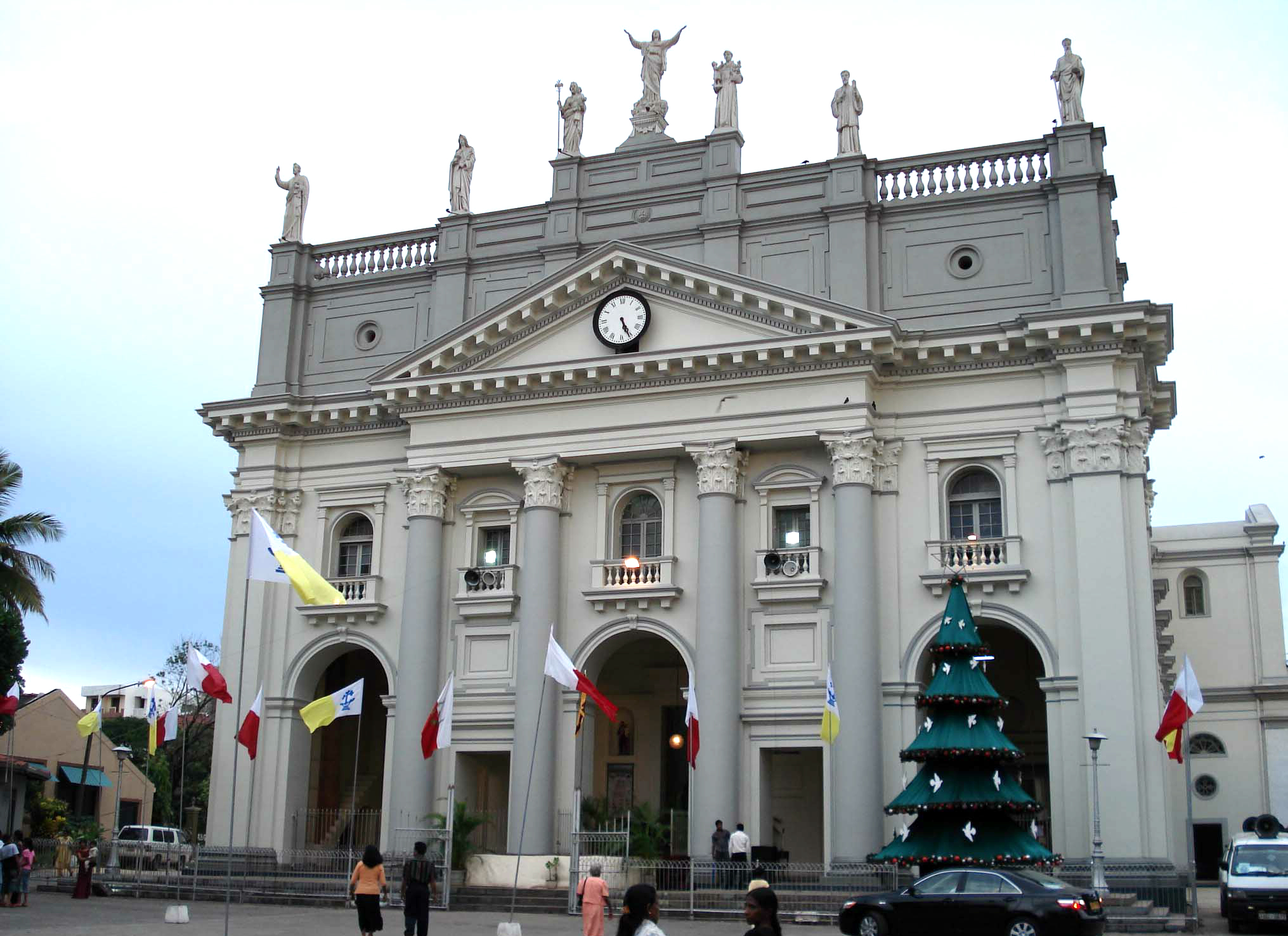
St. Lucia's Cathedral, Colombo

Dioceses	Church	Type	Town
Anuradhapura	St. Joseph's Cathedral, Anuradhapura	Cathedral	Anuradhapura
Badulla	St. Mary’s Cathedral	Cathedral	Badulla
Batticaloa	St. Mary's Cathedral	Cathedral	Batticaloa
Chilaw	St. Mary's Cathedral, Chilaw	Cathedral	Chilaw
Colombo	St. Lucia's Cathedral	Cathedral & seat of the Archbishop	Colombo
Galle	St. Mary’s Cathedral	Cathedral	Galle
Jaffna	St. Mary’s Cathedral	Cathedral	Jaffna
Kandy	St. Anthony's Cathedral, Kandy	Cathedral	Kandy
Kurunegala	St. Anne's Cathedral, Kurunegala	Cathedral	Kurunegala
Mannar	St. Sebastian’s Cathedral	Cathedral	Mannar
Ratnapura	St. Peter and Paul Cathedral, Ratnapura	Cathedral	Ratnapura
Trincomalee	St. Mary's Cathedral, Trincomalee	Cathedral	Trincomalee

=== National Shrines ===
Dioceses	Church	Type	Town
Colombo	Basilica of Our Lady of Lanka	Shrine & Minor Basilica	Ragama
Colombo	St. Anthony’s National Shrine	Shrine	Colombo
Colombo	St. Sebastian's Shrine	Shrine	Kandana
Chilaw	St. Anne's Shrine	Shrine	Thalawila
Matara	Shrine of Our Lady of Matara	Shrine	Matara
Mannar	Shrine of Our Lady of Madhu	Shrine	Madhu
Kandy	St. Anthony's Church	Shrine	Wahakotte

== See also ==
- Christianity in Sri Lanka
- Freedom of religion in Sri Lanka
- Catholic Bishops' Conference of Sri Lanka
- List of Saints from Asia
- Mannar Catholic martyrs (1544)
