= Archdiocese of Colombo =

Latin Catholic archdiocese in Sri Lanka

Coordinates: 6.9482°N 79.8643°E

Archdiocese of Colombo Archidioecesis Columbensis in Taprobane කොළඹ අගරදගුරු පදවිය கொழும்பு உயர்மறைமாவட்டம்
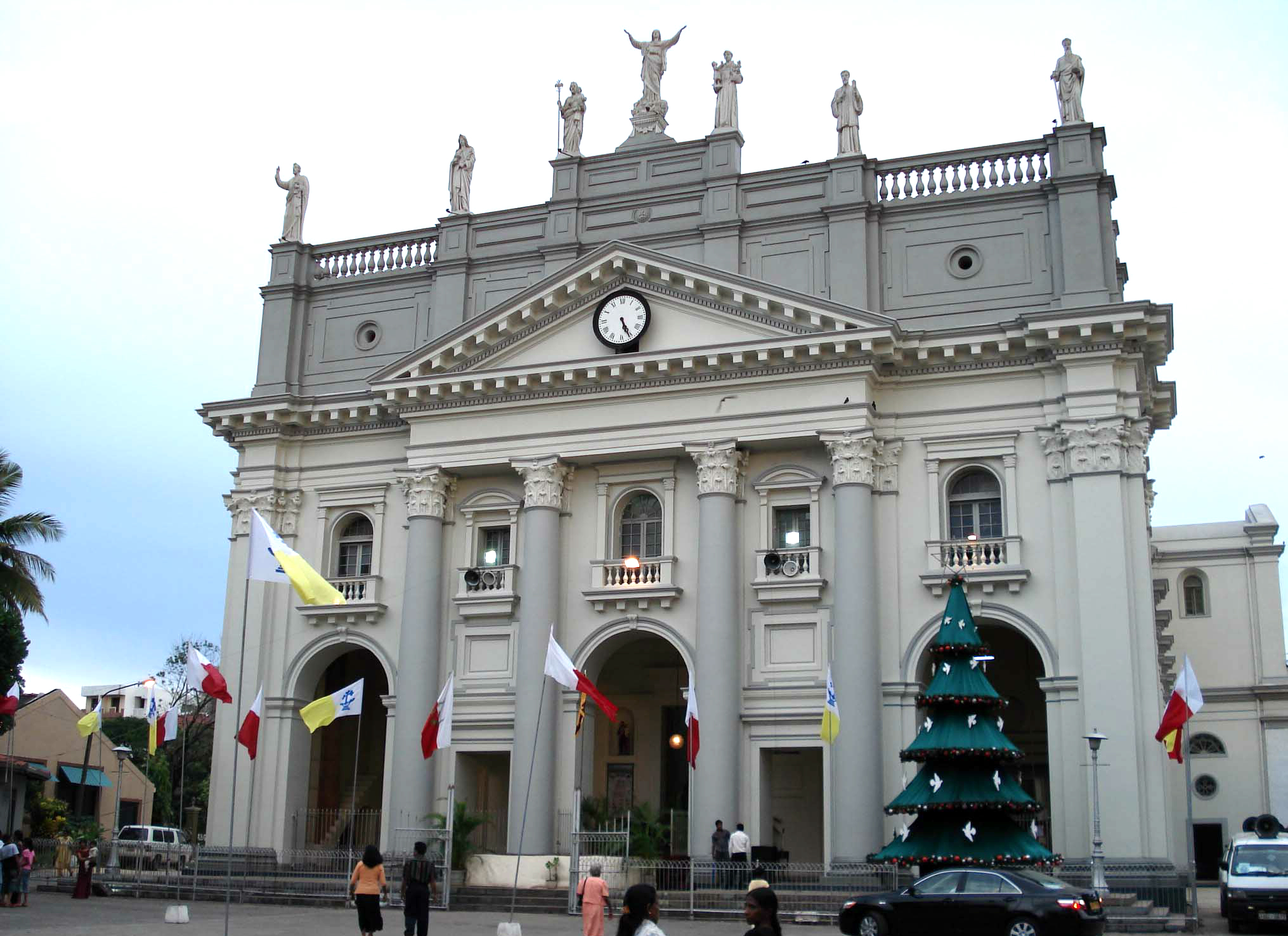
- St. Lucia's Cathedral in Kotahena.

Location
- Country: Sri Lanka; Maldives
- Ecclesiastical province: Colombo

Statistics
- Area: 3,838 km^{2} (1,482 sq mi)
- Population: Total; Catholics: (as of 2006); 5,692,004; 700,000 (12.3%)

Information
- Denomination: Catholic Church
- Sui iuris church: Latin Church
- Rite: Roman Rite
- Cathedral: St. Lucia's Cathedral
- Patron saint: Our Lady of Assumption

Current leadership
- Pope: Leo XIV
- Metropolitan Archbishop: Malcolm Ranjith
- Auxiliary Bishops: Maxwell Silva (2012–to date); Anthony Jayakody (2018 June–to date); Anton Ranjith Pillainayagam (2020 July–to date)
- Bishops emeritus: Vincent Marius Peiris; Auxiliary Bishop (2000 - 2018)

Website
- Official website

The Metropolitan Archdiocese of Colombo (Latin: Archidioecesis Columbensis in Taprobane) is a Latin Catholic metropolitan archdiocese of the Catholic Church, whose ecclesiastical province covers all Sri Lanka plus the Maldives (which are within the archbishopric). It depends on the missionary Roman Congregation for the Evangelization of Peoples.

The current archbishop of Colombo, appointed by Pope Benedict XVI on 16 June 2009, is Cardinal Malcolm Ranjith. He is assisted in this role by the auxiliary bishops.

The archdiocesan mother church and cathedral seat of its metropolitan archbishop is St. Lucia's Cathedral. Its other national shrines are the Basilica of Our Lady of Lanka in Tewatta and St. Anthony's National Shrine, a minor basilica in Kochchikade.

== Statistics ==
As of 2014, it pastorally served 637,729 Catholics (8.8% of 7,281,000 total) on 3,838 km^{2} in 128 parishes with 592 priests (313 diocesan, 279 religious), 1,560 lay religious (380 brothers, 1,180 sisters) and 292 seminarians.

== History ==
It was erected as the Diocese of Ceylon, on territory split off from the Diocese of Cochin by Pope Gregory XVI on December 3, 1834.

Renamed as the Diocese of Colombo on February 17, 1845, having lost territory to establish the then Apostolic Vicariate of Jaffna (now a suffragan diocese). Part of the diocese was transferred on 20 April, 1883, to establish the then Apostolic Vicariate of Kandy (now its suffragan diocese)

Pope Leo XIII elevated it to Metropolitan Archdiocese of Colombo on September 1, 1886.

Further parts of the diocese were taken to establish the Diocese of Galle on 28 August 1893, to establish the Diocese of Trincomalee on 5 January 1939, and to establish the Diocese of Chilaw. All three of these are among its suffragan dioceses.

Its name was changed by Pope Pius XII to the Archdiocese of Colombo in Ceylon on 6 December 6 1944, but the name Archdiocese of Colombo was restored on May 22, 1972 by Pope Paul VI. It enjoyed Papal visits from Pope Paul VI (December 1970), Pope John Paul II (January 1995) and Pope Francis (January 2015).

The archdiocese is taking a leading role in the canonisation process for the hundreds of people at Mass who were killed in the 2019 Easter Sunday terrorist attack in Columbo.

== Ecclesiastical province ==
Its suffragan sees are :

- Diocese of Anuradhapura
- Diocese of Badulla
- Diocese of Batticaloa
- Diocese of Chilaw
- Diocese of Galle
- Diocese of Jaffna
- Diocese of Kandy
- Diocese of Kurunegala
- Diocese of Mannar
- Diocese of Ratnapura
- Diocese of Trincomalee

== Bishops ==
=== Ordinaries ===
Bishops of Ceylon

- Vicente do Rosayro, C.O. (1836–1842)
- Caetano Antonio Mulsuce, C.O. (1843–1845); see below

Bishops of Colombo

- Caetano Antonio Mulsuce, C.O. (1845–1857); see above
- Giuseppe Maria Bravi, O.S.B. Silv. (1857–1860)
- Hilarion Silani, O.S.B. Silv. (1863–1879)
- Clemente Pagnani, O.S.B. Silv. (1879–1883), appointed Apostolic Vicar and later Bishop of Kandy
- Christophe-Etienne Bonjean, O.M.I. (1883–1886); see below

Archbishops of Colombo

- Christophe-Etienne Bonjean, O.M.I. (1886–1892); see above
- André-Théophile Mélizan, O.M.I. (1893–1905)
- Antoine Coudert, O.M.I. (1905–1929)
- Pierre-Guillaume Marque, O.M.I. (1929–1937)
- Jean-Marie Masson, O.M.I. (1938–1944); see below

Archbishops of Colombo in Ceylon

- Jean-Marie Masson, O.M.I. (1944–1947); see above
- Thomas Cooray, O.M.I. (1947–1972); Cardinal in 1965; see below

Archbishops of Colombo

- Cardinal Thomas Cooray, O.M.I. (1972–1976); see above
- Nicholas Fernando (1977–2002)
- Oswald Gomis (2002–2009)
- Malcolm Ranjith (2009–present); Cardinal in 2010

=== Coadjutor Archbishops of Colombo ===
- Antoine Coudert, O.M.I. (1898–1905)
- Thomas Benjamin Cooray, O.M.I. (1945–1947), future Cardinal

=== Auxiliary Bishops of Colombo ===
- Anthony de Saram (1962–1965) Titular Bishop of Tacapae; appointed Bishop of Galle
- Frank Marcus Fernando (1965–1968) Titular Bishop of Oliva; appointed Coadjutor Bishop of Chilaw
- Edmund Joseph Fernando (1968–1983) Titular Bishop of Igilgili; appointed Bishop of Badulla
- Oswald Gomis (1968–1995) Titular Bishop of Mulia; appointed Bishop of Anuradhapura; later returned here as Archbishop
- Malcolm Ranjith (1991–1995) Titular Bishop of Cabarsussi; appointed Bishop of Ratnapura; later returned here as Archbishop; future Cardinal
- Vincent Marius Joseph Peiris (2001–2018) Titular Bishop of Tacarata
- Fidelis Lionel Emmanuel Fernando (2012–2017) Titular Bishop of Horta; appointed Bishop of Mannar
- Maxwell Silva (2012–Present) Titular Bishop of Lesina
- Jayakody Aratchige Don Anton Jayakody (2018–Present) Titular Bishop of Mulli
- Anton Ranjith Pillainayagam (2020–Present) Titular Bishop of Materiana

== List of churches in the archdiocese ==
- Our Lady of Sorrows Church, Kandawala
- Christ the King Church, Pannipitiya
- St. Thomas' Church, Kotte
- Our Lady of Fatima Church, Battaramulla
- All Saints' Church, Borella
- St. Mary's Church, Maharagama
- Sacred Heart Church, Rajagiriya
- Holy Rosary Church, Slave Island, Colombo-02
- St. Philip Neri's Church, Pettah, Colombo-12
- St. Anthony's Church, Kollupitiya, Colombo-03
- St. Mary's Church. Bambalapitiya, Colombo-04
- St. Lawrence's Church, Wellawatte, Colombo-06
- St. Anthony's Shrine, Kochchikade, Colombo
- Fatima Church, Maradana
- St. Joseph's Church, Grandpass, Colombo 14
- St. Mary's Church, Mattakuliya, Colombo 15
- St. James the Great Church, Mutwal, Colombo 15
- St. Sebastian's Church, Panchikawatha, Colombo 10

=== St. Theresa's Church Colombo ===
The Church of St. Theresa is a Catholic church located at Thimbirigasyaya Road, Colombo, Sri Lanka. The current parish priest is Rev. Fr. Neil Dias Karunarathne C.Ss.R.

Over time the Catholic community of the area had been growing, and a Fr. James initiated a process in 1934 to construct the existing church. In 1937, a proposal was made to Fr. Giwdan, the parish priest of Bambalapitiya, to lay a foundation for a Catholic church. The bishop gave his permission, and as a result the temporary structure was built and dedicated to St. Theresa.

In 1951, construction started and in 1952 Archbishop Thomas Cooray has handed over the church to Dominican fathers. It was completed and consecrated on 7 October 1961 by Archbishop Thomas Cooray.

== See also ==
- List of Catholic dioceses in Sri Lanka and the Maldives
- Catholic Church in Sri Lanka

== Sources and external links ==
- Official website
- GCatholic.org, Google map and satellite photo; data for most sections
- Catholic-Hierarchy
- Church official website
- Senewiratne, A.M. (2020) Till The Mountains Disappear: The Story of St. Joseph's College, Sri Lanka.
