= St. Patrick's College, Jaffna =

St. Patrick's College
- புனித பத்திரிசியார் கல்லூரி

Location
- Mathews Road, Gurunagar; Jaffna, Northern Province; Sri Lanka
- Coordinates: 9°39′19.80″N 80°01′19.30″E

Information
- School type: Private 1AB
- Motto: Latin: Fide et labore (By faith and labour)
- Religious affiliation: Roman Catholic
- Founded: 1850; 176 years ago
- Founder: Msgr Orazio Bettacchini
- School district: Jaffna Education Zone
- Authority: Bishop of Jaffna Roman Catholic Church
- School number: 1001030
- Rector: Rev. A. P. Thirumahan
- Grades: 1–13
- Gender: Boys
- Age range: 5–19
- Language: Tamil; English (Grades 6–13)
- Schedule: 7:30 AM to 1:30 PM
- Hours in school day: 6
- Houses: 4 (Mathews, Bonjean, Dunne, Long)
- Colours: Green; Gold
- School fees: Rs. 7000 per annum
- Website: spcjaffna.org

St. Patrick's College (SPC) (Tamil: புனித பத்திரிசியார் கல்லூரி Punitha Pattiriciyār Kallūri) is a private boys' school in Gurunagar, Jaffna, Sri Lanka. It was founded in 1850 by Roman Catholic missionaries.

== History ==
The Jaffna Catholic English School was established in 1850 by Monsignor Orazio Bettacchini, an Italian Roman Catholic missionary. It was later renamed The Jaffna Boys' Seminary, before being registered as a high school and renamed as St. Patrick's College on 10 January 1881. Rev. John Smythe, formerly of the Ceylon Civil Services, became the school's first rector.

Rev. Charles Matthews, a graduate of the University of Ottawa, served as rector from 1906 to 1936 (with brief interruptions). He implemented formal rules for academics and sports in the school.

While many private schools in Ceylon were nationalised in 1960, St. Patrick's College remained a private, non-fee levying institution.

In 2025, St. Patrick's College commemorated its 175th anniversary.

== Sports ==
St. Patrick’s College regularly plays against Jaffna College in an annual cricket match known as the Battle of the Golds. The first match took place in 1917.

== List of rectors ==
- 1850–1858 Patrick Foy
- 1859–1861 Rev. Bro. John Joseph Brown
- 1862–1870 Rev. Bro. Patrick Joseph Conway
- 1870 Rev. Bro. Michael A. Murphy
- 1870–1874 Rev. Bro. (Fr.) Patrick O Flanagan
- 1874–1875 T. W. McMahan
- 1875–1880 Rev. Bro. (Fr.) Patrick O Flanagan
- 1880–1883 Rev. Bro. (Fr.) J. A. R. Smythe
- 1883–1885 Rev. Fr. Charles H. Lytton
- 1885–1888 Rev. Fr. Jules Collin
- 1888–1889 Rev. Fr. M. Dubreuil
- 1889-1901 Rev. Fr. Patrick Dunne
- 1901–1902 Rev. Fr. Jules Collin
- 1902–1905 Rev. Fr. Charles A. Beaud
- 1905–1921 Rev. Fr. Charles S. Matthews
- 1921–1924 Rev. Fr. John A. Guyomar
- 1924–1936 Rev. Fr. Charles S. Matthews
- 1936–1954 Rev. Fr. Timothy M. F. Long
- 1954–1960 Rev. Fr. S. N. Arulnesan
- 1960–1966 Rev. Fr. P. J. Jeevaratnam
- 1966–1976 Rev. Fr. T. A. J. Mathuranayagam
- 1976–1979 Rev. Fr. John A. Francis
- 1979–1992 Rev. Fr. G. A. Michael (Francis) Joseph
- 1992–2002 Rev. Fr. A. I. Bernard
- 2002–2007 Rev. Fr. Dr. Justin Gnanapragasam
- 2008–2017 Rev. Fr. Jero Selvanayagam
- 2017–present Rev. Fr. A. P. Thirumahan

== Notable alumni ==
- S. C. C. Anthony Pillai – Trade unionist and Member of Parliament.
- Leo Rajendram Antony – Roman Catholic Bishop of Trincomalee–Batticaloa.
- Anton Arulanandam – Secretary of the Amateur Athletic Association of Ceylon.
- Tissa Balasuriya – Roman Catholic priest and theologian.
- Bertram Bastiampillai – Professor of political science and history, Ombudsman/Parliamentary Commissioner for Administration.
- S. F. Chellapah – Director of Medical and Sanitary Services.
- H. S. David – Priest, scholar and linguist.
- Bastiampillai Deogupillai – Roman Catholic Bishop of Jaffna.
- H. Luxman David – Major General.
- V. Dharmalingam – Member of Parliament for Uduvil.
- Jerome Emilianuspillai – Roman Catholic Bishop of Jaffna.
- Justin Gnanapragasam – Roman Catholic Bishop of Jaffna.
- E. L. B. Hurulle – Cabinet Minister, Member of Parliament, Governor of the North Central Province.
- W. L. Jeyasingham – Dean of the Faculty of Arts, University of Jaffna.
- Rayappu Joseph – Roman Catholic Bishop of Mannar.
- Valentine Joseph – Professor of mathematics.
- A. Kanagasabapathy – Mudaliyar of Mullaitivu District.
- W. M. T. B. Menikdiwela – Secretary to the President, Divisional Revenue Officer.
- N. Nadarajah – Judge, Supreme Court of Ceylon.
- V. Navaratnam – Member of Parliament for Kayts.
- Paul Perera – Roman Catholic Bishop of Kandy.
- Jaya Pathirana – Member of Parliament for Kurunegala, Judge, Supreme Court of Sri Lanka.
- G. G. Ponnambalam – Leader of the All Ceylon Tamil Congress, Member of Parliament.
- Kumar Ponnambalam – Leader of the All Ceylon Tamil Congress.
- T. J. Rajaratnam – High court judge.
- A. B. Rajendra – Member of the Senate.
- T. M. Sabaratnam – Member of the Legislative Council of Ceylon.
- R. Sampanthan – Leader of the Illankai Tamil Arasu Kachchi/Tamil National Alliance, Member of Parliament.
- Harry Sandrasagra – Member of the Legislative Council of Ceylon.
- Thomas Savundaranayagam – Roman Catholic Bishop of Jaffna.
- Antony Selvanayagam – Roman Catholic Bishop of Penang.
- S. Sivapalan – Member of Parliament for Trincomalee.
- Kingsley Swampillai – Roman Catholic Bishop of Trincomalee.
- Alfred Thambiayah – Member of Parliament for Kayts.
- T. T. Thambyahpillai – Astrophysicist.
- Xavier Thaninayagam – Tamil scholar.
- Kanthiah Vaithianathan – Cabinet Minister, Member of the Senate, Permanent Secretary.
- Susaipillai P. Vanderkoon – Mudaliyar of Kalpitiya District.
- Dominic Vendargon – Roman Catholic Archbishop of Kuala Lumpur.
- V. Yogeswaran – Member of Parliament for Jaffna.
- Yogaswami – Spiritual master.

== See also ==
- List of schools in Northern Province, Sri Lanka

== Sources ==
- Arumugam, S. (1997). Dictionary of Biography of the Tamils of Ceylon.
