= Rajavarothiam =

Rajavarothiam (Tamil: இராஜவரோதயம்; Sinhala: රාජවරෝදියම්) is a given name and a surname. Notable people with the name include:

- N. R. Rajavarothiam (1908–1963), Sri Lankan politician
- Rajavarothiam Sampanthan (1933–2024), Sri Lankan politician and lawyer
