= St. Mary's Cathedral, Batticaloa =

Roman Catholic cathedral in Puliyanthivu, Batticaloa, Sri Lanka

St. Mary's Cathedral
- புனித மரியன்னை பேராலயம்
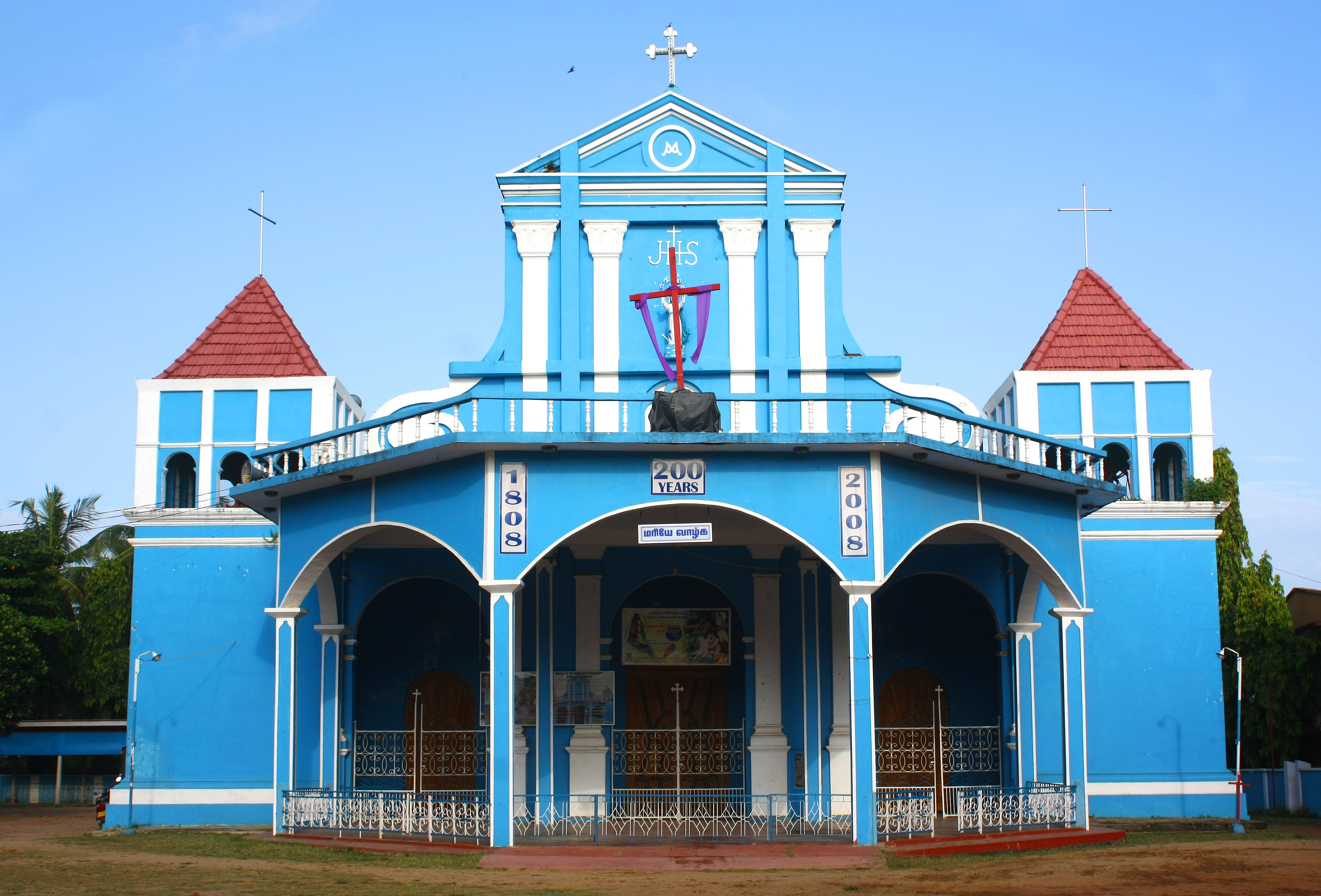

- Location in central Batticaloa
- 07°42′44.80″N 81°41′46.50″E
- Location: Batticaloa
- Country: Sri Lanka
- Denomination: Roman Catholic

History
- Status: Cathedral

Architecture
- Functional status: Active
- Groundbreaking: 1808; 218 years ago

Administration
- Archdiocese: Colombo
- Diocese: Batticaloa

Clergy
- Bishop: Joseph Ponniah

The Cathedral of St. Mary (Tamil: புனித மரியன்னை பேராலயம், romanized: Puṉita Mariyaṉṉai Pērālayam; Sinhala: ශාන්ත මරියා ආසන දෙව් මැදුර Śānta Mariyā Āsana Dev Mædura) is a Cathedral of the Roman Catholic Diocese of Batticaloa in Puliyanthivu. The cathedral is a landmark and Catholic historical icon in the district of Batticaloa, Sri Lanka. It was first built in 1808 by Paschal Mudaliyar.

It was co- cathedral under Diocese of Trincomalee-Batticaloa and became a cathedral after the creation of Diocese of Batticaloa in 2012.

== See also ==
- List of cathedrals in Sri Lanka
- Church of Our Lady of Presentation
- Chandra Fernando (priest)
