= Fidelis Fernando =

Sri Lankan Roman Catholic bishop

Rt Rev. Fidelis Fernando
- Bishop of Mannar
- Native name: பிடெலிசு பெர்னாண்ட
- Church: Roman Catholic Church
- Archdiocese: Colombo
- Diocese: Mannar
- Installed: 22 November 2017
- Predecessor: Rayappu Joseph
- Other post: Auxiliary Bishop of Colombo (2012-2017)

Orders
- Ordination: 6 January 1973 by Pope Paul VI
- Consecration: 11 February 2012 by Cardinal Malcolm Ranjith

Personal details
- Born: May 20, 1948 (age 78) Jaffna, Sri Lanka
- Education: Pontifical Urban University; St. Benedict's College, Colombo; Catholic University of America

Right Reverend Dr. Fidelis Lionel Emmanuel Fernando (Tamil: பிடெலிசு பெர்னாண்டோ, Sinhala: ෆිදේලිස් ප්‍රනාන්දු; born 20 May 1948) is a Sri Lankan priest and current Roman Catholic Bishop of Mannar. He is the first Bishop appointed from among the Bharatha community of Sri Lanka.

== Early life and ministry ==
Fernando was born in 1948 to Xavier Bastian Fernando- an engineer- and Gnanasourubi Fernando in Jaffna. The family were devout Catholics, and part of the Sri Lankan Bharatha community descended from immigrants from Vembar, Tamil Nadu. The family moved to Grandpass in 1951 and then to Kotahena in 1955, where Fidelis was already enrolled at St. Benedict's College along with his brothers Joe and John. He became part of the St. John Berchman's Society of Altar Servers at St. Lucia's Cathedral, and joined the St. Aloysius Seminary after completing his Ordinary Level exams, where he was a contemporary of Malcolm Ranjith. He then moved to the St. Eymard's Minor Seminary at Haputale for a brief period, and then to the National Seminary at Ampitiya in 1966. In August 1969, he was sent to the Pontifical Urban University by Cardinal Thomas Cooray; he graduated in 1972 with a Bachelor of Theology, and was ordained a priest on 6 January 1973 in Rome by Pope Paul VI alongside 38 others from 19 nations on the 350th Anniversary of the Congregation for the Evangelization of Peoples. He obtained his Licentiate of Sacred Theology in 1974 and returned to Sri Lanka the same year, consecutively holding the position of assistant parish priest in three parishes, including duties at Kochchikade.

Fernando then returned to the National Seminary, where he lectured until 1987, when he left for the United States for a doctorate in Moral Theology at the Catholic University of America, which he earned in 1987 with a dissertation entitled Population policy of Sri Lanka and the moral teachings of the Catholic Church. On his return to Sri Lanka later that year, he was appointed Vice-Rector at the National Seminary, and then Rector in 1989- a position he would hold until 1991, overseeing reforms at the Seminary, including improvements to its library facilities and streamlining course structures. In the period between 1991 and 2011, he went on to hold several ecclesiastical appointments in the country:

- Pastor, Dean in the Moratuwa area,
- Episcopal Vicar for Catechesis,
- Member of the Apostolate for the Family,
- Episcopal Vicar for the Southern area of the Archdiocese of Colombo,
- Member of the Priests’ Council and the Board of Consultants, and
- Episcopal Vicar for the Faithful of Tamil Origin in the Archdiocese of Colombo.

Three of Fidelis' siblings also went on to serve in the Catholic clergy in Sri Lanka: his brother Joe was attached to the Diocese of Jaffna, while two sisters- Assumpta and Micheline- joined the Apostolic Carmelite Congregation.

== Episcopal ministry ==
A number of priests were considered for appointment as Auxiliary Bishops by Archbishop of Colombo, Cardinal Malcolm Ranjith, with Fernando's name being among them. In preparation, he was assigned the titular see of Horta on 28 November 2011 and on 11 February 2012, was consecrated as an Auxiliary Bishop of the Archdiocese of Colombo at St. Lucia's Cathedral by Cardinal Ranjith and two co-consecrators: Bishop of Trincomalee, Dr. Joseph Kingsley Swampillai and Bishop of Kurunegala, Dr. Harold Anthony Perera. Fernando then functioned, at various times, as Regional Bishop of Negombo and as Chairman of the Episcopal Commission for Ecumenism and Inter-religious Dialogue.

On 28 November 2017, Pope Francis appointed Fernando Bishop of Mannar; he was installed on 30 December that year in a ceremony held at St. Sebastian's Cathedral, Mannar. The ceremony was attended by members of the parish, civil society leaders, Apostolic Administrator Kingsley Swampillai (who oversaw the diocese since the position of Bishop fell vacant in 2016), Cardinal Malcolm Ranjith, Apostolic nuncio Archbishop Pierre Nguyên Van Tot and Bishop of Jaffna Justin Gnanapragasam.

Catholic Church titles
Preceded by Kingsley Swampillai (as Apostolic Administrator)	Bishop of Mannar; 28 November 2017 –	Succeeded by Incumbent
