= St Joseph's College, Trincomalee =

St Joseph's College
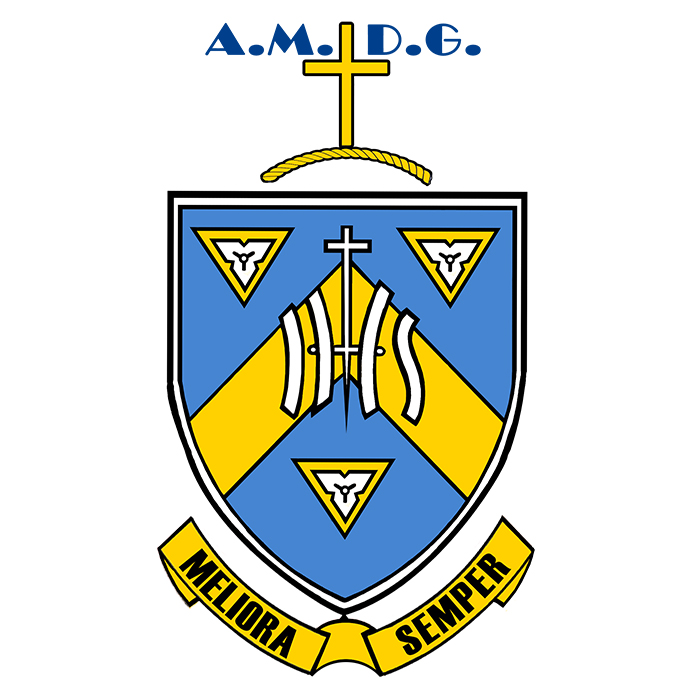
- Logo of St.Joseph's College Trincomalee

Location
- Power House Road; Trincomalee, Eastern Province, 31000; Sri Lanka
- Coordinates: 8°34′24.30″N 81°13′44.20″E

Information
- Other name: SJC
- Type: National school
- Religious affiliation: Catholic
- Established: 27 July 1867; 158 years ago
- Founder: Louis Mary Keating
- Principal: C.Deogopillai
- Website: www.trincojoseph.sch.lk

St. Joseph's College (SJC) is a national school in Trincomalee, Eastern Province, Sri Lanka.

== History ==
The school was founded on 27 July 1867 by Rev. Fr. Louis Mary Keating. On 1 April 1931 the Roman Catholic Diocese of Trincomalee-Batticaloa handed the school over to the Society of Jesus of the Province of Louisiana. Most private schools in Ceylon were taken over by the government in 1960 but SJC chose to remain as a private and non-fee levying school. The school struggled financially thereafter and ten years later the school was handed over to the government.

== Principals ==
- 1867–1881 Rev.Fr. L. Mary Keating O.M.I.
- 1882–1901 Rev.Fr. Charles Manict O.M.I.
- 1902–1911 Rev.Fr. Charles Bonnel S.J.
- 1912–1920 Rev.Fr. Charles Reichard S.J.
- 1921–1932 Rev.Fr. S.M. Soosaimuttu S.J.
- 1932–1938 Rev.Fr. A.E.A. Crowther S.J.
- 1938–1947 Rev.Fr. Julius Theisen S.J.
- 1947–1953 Rev.Fr. Claude R. Dalys S.J.
- 1954–1955 Rev.Fr. Peter C. Beach S.J.
- 1955–1956 Rev.Fr. John J. Heaney S.J.
- 1956–1965 Rev.Fr. Frederick B. Ponder S.J.
- 1969–1970 Rev.Fr. Eugene J. Herbert S.J.
- 1965–1968,1970–1981 Rev.Fr. Vincent De Paul Gnanapragasam S.J.
- 1981–1985 Mr. Anthony Saminathan
- 1985–1989 Mr. D.S.A. Wanasinghe
- 1989–1997 Mr.J.S. Guy De Font Gallan J.P.
- 1997–2002 Rev.Bro. Anthonypillai Soosaithasan S.S.J.
- 2003–2012 Rev.Fr. Jeevanadas Fernando O.M.I.
- 2012–2016 Rev.Fr. S. Anthony Poncian O.M.I.
- 2016–2024 Rev.Fr. Alfred Vijayakamalan
- 2024 present Mr.C.Deogupillai

== Notable alumni ==
- Joseph Ponniah — priest
- R. Sampanthan — Sri Lankan politician and lawyer
- Noel Emmanuel — priest

== See also ==
- List of schools in Eastern Province, Sri Lanka
- List of Jesuit sites
