= H. S. David =

Sri Lankan Tamil scholar, priest and linguist

Reverend Father Doctor Hyacinth Singarayar David
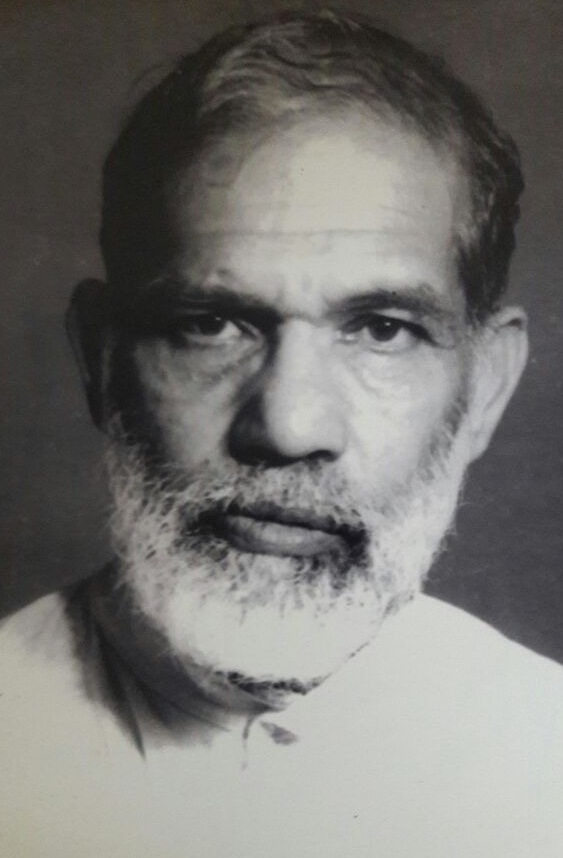
- Church: Roman Catholic Church

Personal details
- Born: 28 June 1907 Thumpalai, Jaffna, Sri Lanka
- Died: 1 June 1981 (aged 73) St. Patrick's College, Jaffna

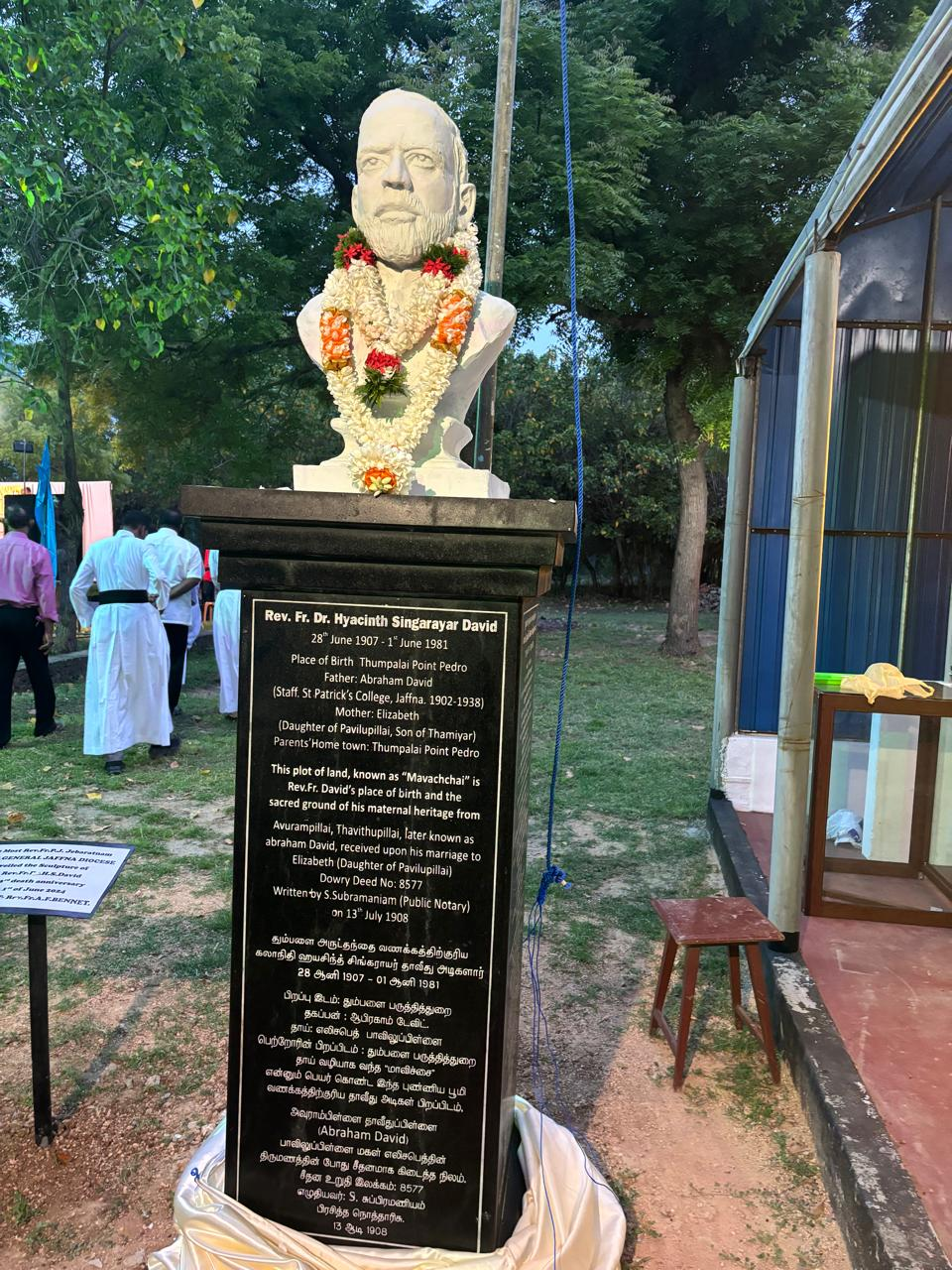
Bust of Rev Fr. (Dr.) Hyacinth Singarayar David at his birth place in Thumpalai, Point Pedro

Rev Fr. (Dr.) Hyacinth Singarayar David was a Sri Lankan Tamil priest, scholar and linguist.

David mastered in 33 languages in his lifetime.

He died of shock on 1 June 1981 after seeing flames engulfing Jaffna Library from his room at St. Patrick's College, Jaffna, the night before.

== Early life and education ==
David was born as the eldest son of Abrahampillai and Elizabeth David on 28 June 1907 in Thumpalai, Jaffna Peninsula.

He went to St. Patrick's College, Jaffna for his education from 1913 to 1924. His father Abrahampillai was a teacher at the St. Patrick’s College during the period of his schooling.

== Higher studies and career ==
David joined at University of London as an external student through University College, Colombo to pursue his higher studies in history and completed with a first class honours degree.

Instead of joining highly sought-after Ceylon Civil Service, he joined St. Bernard’s seminary and was ordained as a priest on 19 December 1931.

David started his career as a teacher at St. Patrick's College, Jaffna in 1936 and continued till 1967.

After completing his Master's degree in Indo-Aryan languages in 1947, he went to the United Kingdom for his postgraduate studies between 1948 and 1952.

David completed his doctorate at University of London with his research work on A critical study of Tolkappiyam, with special references to the Eluttatikaram in 1952.

He served as an examiner for doctorate candidates at the University of Madras.

== Research and publications ==
David completed the incomplete work of Gnanapragasar on Tamil lexicon, because of his death. He traced the connection in Aryan, Dravidian and European languages to the Tamil language while completing the lexicon.

He published numerous books and articles of scholarly interest during his career. Though some of his books were destroyed during the Sri Lankan Civil War in 1987, some of his works are traceable currently among the academic community and institutions internationally including Harvard University, University of Wisconsin, and University of Virginia.

== Proficiency in languages ==
David became fluent in 33 languages in his life time; the languages he mastered include 14 European (English, Latin, French, Greek, German, Dutch, Lithuanian, Spanish, Portuguese, Italian, Danish, Norwegian, Swedish, Russian); 5 Semitic and other (Hebrew, Malay, Assyrian, Sumerian, Arabic); and 14 Indo-Asiatic Dravidaryan (Ardra) (Tamil, Sinhalese, Sanskrit, Vedic, Hindi, Kannada, Pali, Prakrit, Avestan, Telugu, Malayalam, Brahui, Tulu, Kui).

He had also some familiarity with nearly 70 other languages.

== Death ==
David was in his room which was located on the third story of St. Patrick's College. He came out of the room after some priests called him out. They showed the flames engulfing Jaffna Library and he became uneasy with a heavy-heart. He was looking at it with shock for some time. He then came to his room and went to sleep. He was found dead in his room the next morning.

== Legacy ==
A statute of David was erected in the library courtyard.
