= Thuya Joseph Vaz Maha Vidyalayam =

Educational institution in Sri Lanka

Mn/Thuya Josephvaz Maha Vithiyalayam, Vidathaltheevu is a school in Northwestern Sri Lanka, near the 400-year-old St James' Church at Vidathaltheevu. The school's original name was Mn/Vidathaltheevu Roman Catholic Tamil Mixed School.

== History ==
Prior to 1900, the playground land of St. James Church was donated by the Jaffna Roman Catholic diocese to construct a primary school. This therefore confirms that the school was built before the year 1900. It is believed that the primary school was taken over by the government on 3 June 1918.

In 1960 the school was taken over by the government. In 1968 the United National Party, in line with their reconstruction planning, lowered the highest grade to seven and ordered that the older children were moved to the nearby Muslim school. When the parents and students of the school complained due to this, Pesalai-born Silvester Antony Thuram was appointed as the principal. He and others brought back the higher grades in 1969. In 1970 a temporary injunction granted by the Ministry of Education of the ruling United National Party upgraded the school to tenth grade.

The school has accepted both Catholic and non-Catholic students.
