= R. Sampanthan =

Sri Lankan politician and lawyer (1933–2024)

Hon. R. Sampanthan
- இரா. சம்பந்தன்
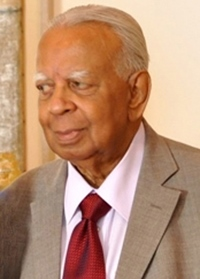
- Sampanthan in 2013

14th Leader of the Opposition
- In office 3 September 2015 – 18 December 2018
- President: Maithripala Sirisena
- Prime Minister: Ranil Wickremesinghe; Mahinda Rajapaksa
- Preceded by: Nimal Siripala De Silva
- Succeeded by: Mahinda Rajapaksa

Leader of the Tamil National Alliance
- In office 2001 – 30 June 2024

Member of Parliament for Trincomalee District
- In office 5 December 2001 – 30 June 2024
- Succeeded by: K. S. Kugathasan
- Majority: 33,834
- In office 1997 – 18 August 2000
- Preceded by: Arunasalam Thangathurai

Member of Parliament for Trincomalee
- In office 21 July 1977 – 7 September 1983
- Preceded by: B. Neminathan
- Majority: 15,144

Personal details
- Born: 5 February 1933 Trincomalee, British Ceylon
- Died: 30 June 2024 (aged 91) Colombo, Sri Lanka
- Party: Illankai Tamil Arasu Kachchi
- Other political affiliations: Tamil National Alliance
- Education: Ceylon Law College
- Profession: Lawyer
- Ethnicity: Sri Lankan Tamil

Rajavarothiam Sampanthan (Tamil: இராஜவரோதயம் சம்பந்தன்; Sinhala: රාජවරෝදියම් සම්බන්දන්; 5 February 1933 – 30 June 2024) was a Sri Lankan politician and lawyer who led the Tamil National Alliance from 2001 until his death in 2024. He was one of the longest serving Member of Parliament in the country, serving as an MP from 2001 until his death, and previously from 1977 to 1983 and from 1997 to 2000. He was the Leader of the Opposition from September 2015 to December 2018.

== Background ==
Sampanthan was born on 5 February 1933. He was the son of A. Rajavarothiam, Superintendent of Stores at the Gal Oya Project. Sampanthan was related to S. Sivapalan and N. R. Rajavarothiam both of whom were MPs for Trincomalee. He was educated at St. Patrick's College, Jaffna, St. Anne's College, Kurunegala, St. Joseph's College, Trincomalee and St. Sebastian's College, Moratuwa. After school he joined Ceylon Law College, graduating as an attorney at law. After qualifying, Sampanthan practised law in Trincomalee.

Sampanthan married Leeladevi, daughter of P. K. Rudra. They had two sons (Sanjeevan and Senthuran) and one daughter (Krishanthini). R. Sampanthan died at a private hospital on 30 June 2024, at the age of 91.

== Political career ==
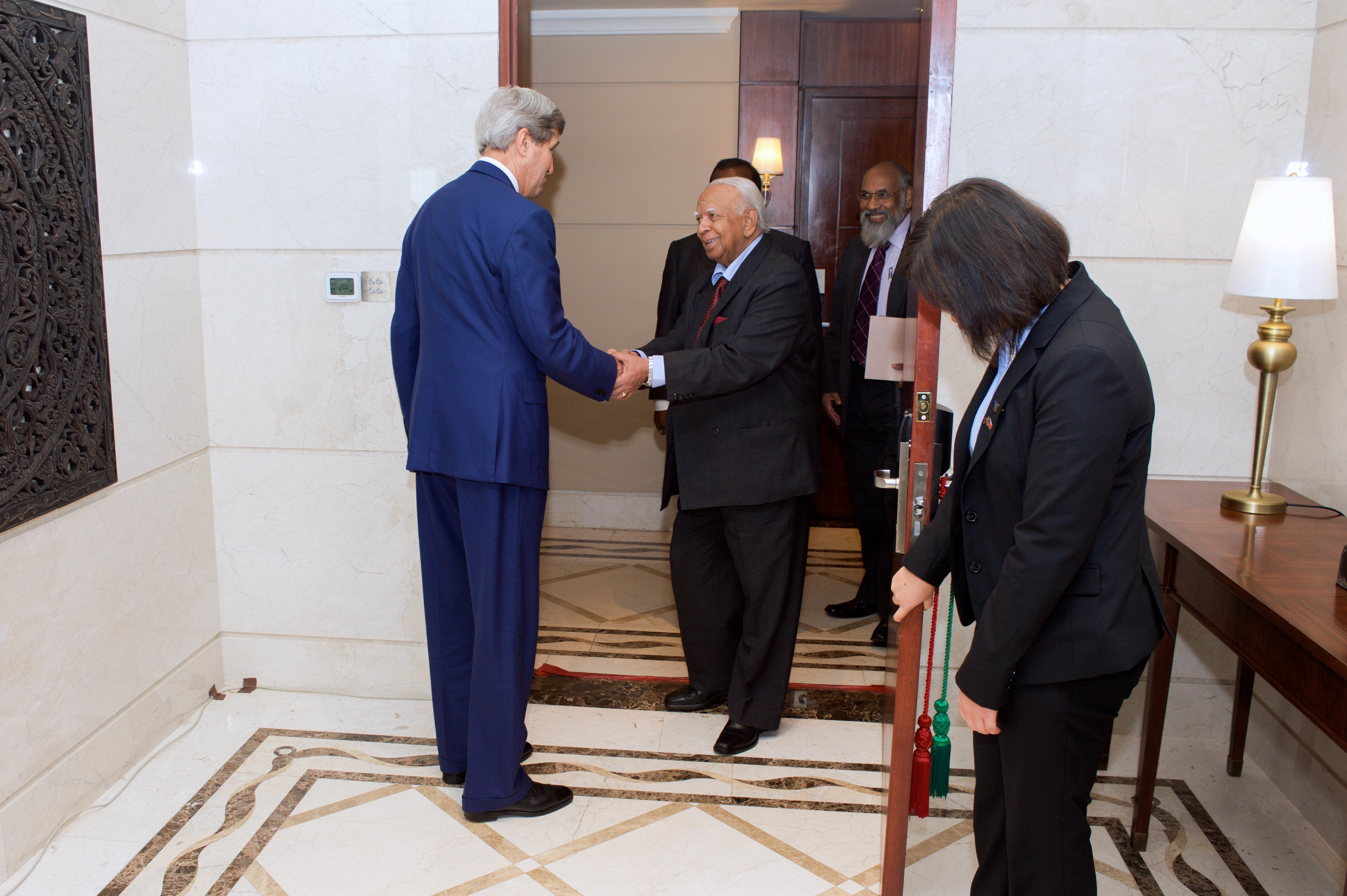
U. S. Secretary of State John Kerry meets Sampanthan in May 2015.

Sampanthan joined the Illankai Tamil Arasu Kachchi (Federal Party) in 1956. ITAK leader S. J. V. Chelvanayakam offered Sampanthan nomination in 1963 and 1970 but Sampanthan declined.

On 14 May 1972, the ITAK, All Ceylon Tamil Congress (ACTC), Ceylon Workers' Congress, Eelath Thamilar Otrumai Munnani and All Ceylon Tamil Conference formed the Tamil United Front, later renamed Tamil United Liberation Front (TULF). Sampanthan was the TULF's candidate in Trincomalee at the 1977 parliamentary election. He won the election and entered Parliament. Sampanthan and all other TULF MPs boycotted Parliament from the middle of 1983 for a number of reasons: they were under pressure from Sri Lankan Tamil militants not to stay in Parliament beyond their normal six-year term; the Sixth Amendment to the Constitution of Sri Lanka required them to swear an oath unconditionally renouncing support for a separate state. After three months of absence, Sampanthan forfeited his seat in Parliament on 7 September 1983. Sampanthan served as joint treasurer, vice president and general secretary of TULF.

Sampanthan was one of the ENDLF/EPRLF/TELO/TULF alliance's candidates in the Trincomalee District at the 1989 parliamentary election but the alliance failed to win any seats in the district. He was one of the TULF's candidates in Trincomalee District at the 1994 parliamentary election but failed to get re-elected after coming second amongst the TULF candidates. However, he re-entered Parliament in 1997 following the assassination of A. Thangathurai on 5 July 1997. He was one of the TULF's candidates in Trincomalee District at the 2000 parliamentary election but the TULF failed to win any seats in the district.

On 20 October 2001, the ACTC, Eelam People's Revolutionary Liberation Front, Tamil Eelam Liberation Organization and TULF formed the Tamil National Alliance (TNA). Sampanthan became the leader of the TNA. Sampanthan contested the 2001 parliamentary election as one of the TNA's candidates in Trincomalee District. He was elected and re-entered Parliament.

Soon after its formation, the TNA began to take a more pro-Tamil Tiger stance, recognising the Tigers as the sole representative of the Sri Lankan Tamils. This caused a split within the TULF. Some members of the TULF, led by its president V. Anandasangaree, opposed to the Tigers. Anandasangaree refused to allow the TNA to use the TULF name during the 2004 parliamentary election. This caused the members of TULF who wished to remain with the TNA, led by Sampanthan, to resurrect the Illankai Tamil Arasu Kachchi political party. Sampanthan became the new leader of the ITAK.

Sampanthan was re-elected in the 2004, 2010 and 2015 parliamentary elections. During the 2015 Sri Lankan presidential election, the TNA, under his leadership, decided to back Maithripala Sirisena as the common opposition candidate. Sirisena went on to win the election, succeeding incumbent president Mahinda Rajapaksa. Following the 2015 Sri Lankan parliamentary election, the Speaker of the Parliament recognised Sampanthan as Leader of the Opposition on 3 September 2015.

=== Electoral history ===
Electoral history of R. Sampanthan
Election	Constituency	Party	Votes	Result	Sources
1977 parliamentary	Trincomalee	TULF	15,144	Elected	
1989 parliamentary	Trincomalee District	TULF	6,048	Not elected	
1994 parliamentary	Trincomalee District	TULF	19,525	Not elected	
2000 parliamentary	Trincomalee District	TULF		Not elected	
2001 parliamentary	Trincomalee District	TNA	40,110	Elected	
2004 parliamentary	Trincomalee District	TNA	47,735	Elected	
2010 parliamentary	Trincomalee District	TNA	24,488	Elected	
2015 parliamentary	Trincomalee District	TNA	33,834	Elected	
2020 parliamentary	Trincomalee District	TNA	21,422	Elected	
