= Church of Our Lady of Presentation, Batticaloa =

Roman Catholic shrine in Thandavanveli, Batticaloa, Sri Lanka

Church of Our Lady of Presentation
- காணிக்கை மாதா கோயில்
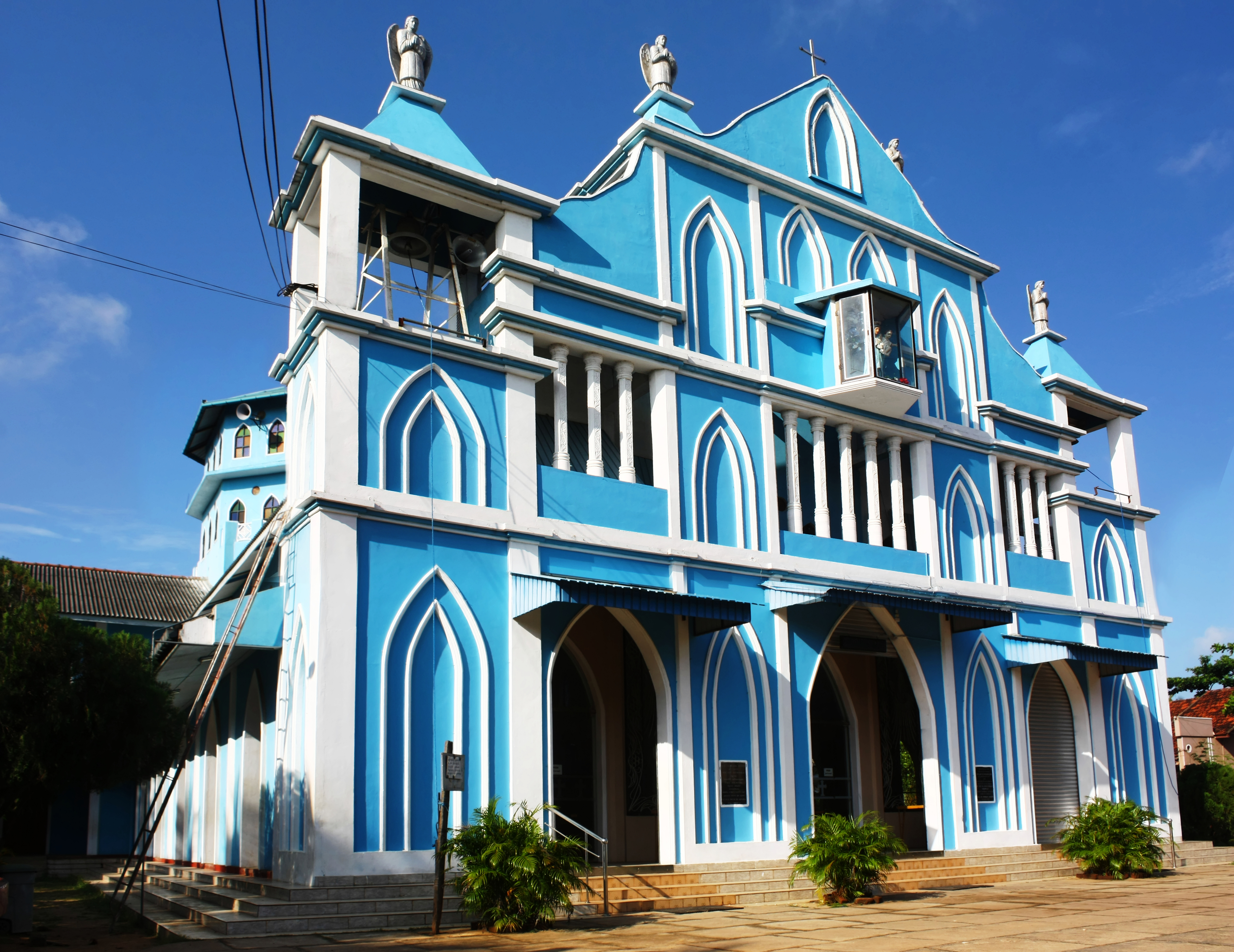
- Church of Our Lady of Presentation

Religion
- Affiliation: Roman Catholic
- Rite: Latin Rite
- Status: Active

Location
- Location: Batticaloa, Sri Lanka
- Interactive map of Church of Our Lady of Presentation
- Coordinates: 7.720159°N 81.695260°E

Architecture
- Type: Church
- Style: Baroque Revival
- Groundbreaking: 1624; 402 years ago
- Direction of façade: Northeast

Website
- thandavanvelichurch.com?lang=en

Church of Our Lady of Presentation (Tamil: காணிக்கை மாதா கோயில்; locally known as Thandavanveli Church; formerly known as Church of Our Lady of Sorrows Tamil: வியாகுல மாதா கோயில்) is a church of the Roman Catholic Diocese of Batticaloa in Thandavanveli. The church is one of the landmarks and catholic historical places in the district of Batticaloa, Sri Lanka. According to the recorded documents, it is known as the first and oldest church in the district.

== History ==
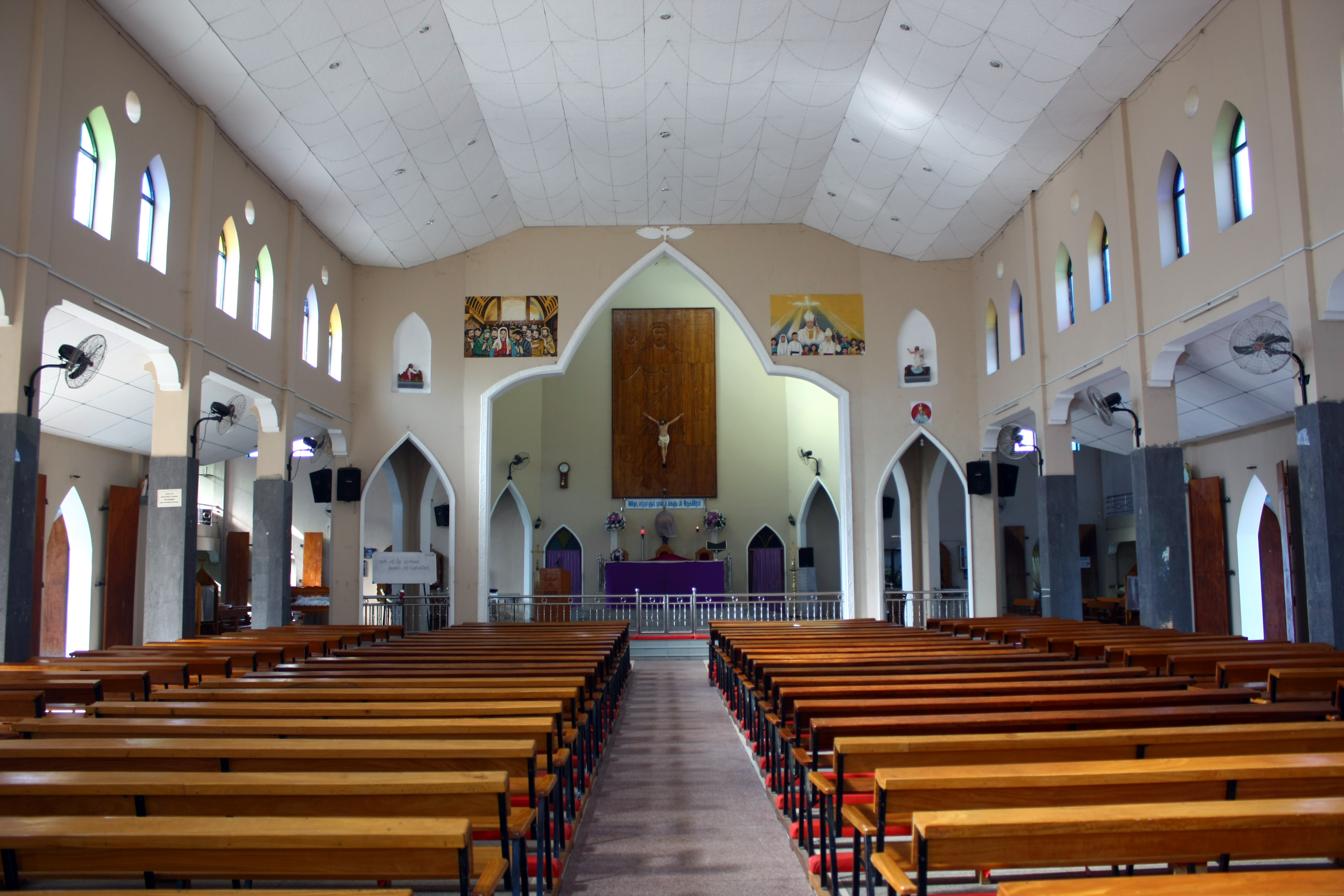
Interior of Church of Our Lady of Presentation

Portuguese arrival in India and Sri Lanka, particularly in Jaffna, influenced the people of Batticaloa. Christian missionaries arrived in Batticaloa in the 1550s, before the military presence of the Portuguese in 1622. The Church of Our Lady of Presentation was built as a palm-leaf hut in 1624 due to missionary expansion.

St. Joseph Vaz secretly visited this church during the persecution of Dutch against Catholics. Vaz revealed himself as a priest to some of the faithful Catholics. Later, Vaz was betrayed by an apostate and arrested by the Dutch. He was tied to a yellow cheesewood (Note: Locally known as "Vammi" tree. It is a Tamil name of the Nauclea orientalis) tree close by the Church of Our Lady of Presentation and was beaten as a punishment.

The Batavian Code of the Dutch East India Company of 1642 restricted practice of religion to Dutch Reformed Church thus Catholic worship was forbidden. The church was burnt by the Dutch and then rebuilt in 1660 by the people with the permission of the Kandyan king. It is said that a statue of Mary at the church has some burn marks at the foot, and it is taken in procession every year on the feast.

The church was damaged by cyclone in 1907 and again suffered by 1978 cyclone. In 1918, Thandavanveli became a new parish created by bishop Robichez. The church's original name was Church of Our Lady of Presentation, and later it was changed as Church of Our Lady of Sorrows. However, it returned to its original name with the reconstruction of edifice.

== Location ==
The church is located in the A15 highway (Trincomalee road), and situated in Thandavanveli, which is in municipal council area of modern Batticaloa town, and 1 km away from the main administrative location, Puliyanthivu.

== See also ==
- Presentation of Mary
- Our Lady of Sorrows
- St. Mary's Cathedral, Batticaloa
