= Joseph Ponniah =

Sri Lankan Roman Catholic bishop (1952–2025)

Rt Rev. Joseph Ponniah
- Bishop Emeritus of Batticaloa
- Church: Roman Catholic Church
- Province: Colombo
- Diocese: Batticaloa
- Installed: 3 July 2012
- Term ended: 19 August 2024
- Predecessor: First
- Successor: Vacant
- Previous posts: Auxiliary Bishop of Trincomalee-Batticaloa and Titular Bishop of Mons in Mauretania (2008–2012)

Orders
- Ordination: 30 April 1980
- Consecration: 24 May 2008 by Kingsley Swampillai

Personal details
- Born: 12 October 1952 Thannamunai, Ceylon
- Died: 19 May 2025 (aged 72) Batticaloa, Sri Lanka
- Education: University of Jaffna; University of Peradeniya; Pontifical Urbaniana University

Joseph Ponniah (12 October 1952 – 19 May 2025) was a Sri Lankan Roman Catholic prelate, who served as a Bishop of Batticaloa.

== Background ==
Ponniah was born on 12 October 1952 in Thannamunai in eastern Ceylon. He was educated at St. Joseph's Minor Seminary and St. Joseph's College, Trincomalee. He had a Bachelor of Philosophy degree from St. Paul Seminary, Thiruchirapally and a Bachelor of Theology from the National Seminary, Poonah. Ponniah also had a Bachelor of Arts degree from the University of Peradeniya, a Licentiate in Biblical Theology degree from the Pontifical Urbaniana University (1993) and a Doctor of Philosophy in Christian civilization from the University of Jaffna.

Ponniah died on 19 May 2025, at the age of 72.

== Career ==
Ponniah was ordained a priest in April 1980. He was parish priest at St. Mary's Co-Cathedral, Batticaloa (1980–82), Vaharai, Veechchu Kalmunai and Ayhiyamalai. He was rector at the Minor Seminar, Batticaloa (1993–96) before teaching Pauline theology as professor of holy scriptures at the National Seminary, Ampitiya (1996-01). He was then parish priest in Thandavanveli (2001–06) and vicar general for the Diocese of Trincomalee-Batticaloa (2006–08). He also lectured at the Eastern University, Sri Lanka. In February 2008 he was appointed Auxiliary Bishop of Trincomalee-Batticaloa and was ordained a bishop in May 2008. He was appointed Bishop of Batticaloa in July 2012.

Catholic Church titles
Preceded by First	Bishop of Batticaloa; 2012–2024	Succeeded by Vacant
Preceded by —	Auxilary Bishop of Trincomalee-Batticaloa; 2008–2012	Succeeded by —
Preceded by Henri Salina	Titular Bishop of Mons in Mauretania; 2008–2012	Succeeded by Alberto Germán Bochatey Chaneton
