= Ponniah =

Ponniah is a Tamil surname. From Tamil pon- ‘gold’ + -aiah an honorific suffix meaning ‘father’.

Notable people with the surname include:

- Joseph Ponniah (1952–2025), Sri Lanka Roman Catholic bishop
- Mano Ponniah (born 1943), Sri Lankan architect, engineer, and cricketer
- Rennis Ponniah, Singaporean Anglican bishop
