= Kingsley Swampillai =

Sri Lankan Tamil priest (born 1936)

Rt Rev. Kingsley Swampillai
- Bishop of Trincomalee
- Church: Roman Catholic Church
- Province: Colombo
- Diocese: Trincomalee
- Installed: 17 March 1983
- Term ended: 3 June 2015
- Predecessor: Leo Rajendram Antony
- Successor: Noel Emmanuel
- Other post: Apostolic Administrator of the Diocese of Mannar (2016-2017)

Personal details
- Born: 9 December 1936 (age 89) Kayts, Ceylon
- Education: St. Patrick's College, Jaffna

Right Reverend Dr. Joseph Kingsley Swampillai (born 9 December 1936) is a Sri Lankan Tamil priest and former Roman Catholic Bishop of Trincomalee.

== Early life and family ==
Swampillai was born on 9 December 1936 in Kayts on the island of Velanaitivu in northern Ceylon. He was educated at St. Patrick's College, Jaffna.

== Career ==
Swampillai was ordained as a priest in December 1961. Even as priest he was chosen to act as a Secretary to Apostolic Nunciature for a period. In addition to his duties as a general secretary and Chancellor to the former Bishop of Jaffna, he was also the General Manager of Catholic Schools in the Diocses of Jaffna from 1975 to 1983. He was holding the office of the National Director of the Pontificial Mission Aid societies for more than Six years until he was elected as a Bishop in April 1983.

In March 1983 he became Bishop of Trincomalee-Batticaloa. He became Bishop of Trincomalee after the creation of the Diocese of Batticaloa in July 2012. Swampillai resigned on 3 June 2015. He was briefly recalled to apostolic service in January 2016 to act as Apostolic Administrator of the Diocese of Mannar when the position of Bishop of Mannar fell vacant after Rayappu Joseph's retirement; he held this appointment until December 2017.

Catholic Church titles
Preceded by Leo Rajendram Antony	Bishop of Trincomalee; 17 March 1983 – 3 June 2015	Succeeded by Noel Emmanuel
Preceded by Rayappu Joseph	Bishop of Mannar (as Apostolic Administrator); 14 January 2016 – 22 November 2017	Succeeded by Fidelis Fernando
