= Jaya Pathirana =

Sri Lankan politician (1921–2000)

Jaya Pathirana MP

Member of the Ceylon Parliament for Kurunegala
- In office 1961–1965
- Preceded by: D. B. Monnekulama
- Succeeded by: D. B. Welagedara

Puisne Justice of the Supreme Court of Sri Lanka
- In office 1972–1978

Personal details
- Born: 18 April 1921
- Died: 25 May 2000 (aged 79)
- Party: Sri Lanka Freedom Party
- Education: Jaffna Central College; St. Patrick's College, Jaffna
- Profession: Lawyer

Jaya Pathirana (18 April 1921 – 25 May 2000) was a Sri Lankan lawyer and member of parliament from 1961 to 1964. He also served as justice of the Supreme Court of Sri Lanka.

== Early life ==
Pathirana was educated at Jaffna Central College and St. Patrick's College, Jaffna.

== Career ==
Pathirana joined the legal profession after university and served as a defence counsel in different parts of the country.

D. B. Monnekulama, the sitting Member of Parliament, was removed from office on 20 December 1960 after being found guilty by the Bribery Commission. Pathirana contested the ensuing by-election as the Sri Lanka Freedom Party (SLFP) and was elected to Parliament on 29 March 1961.

Pathirana was appointed to the Supreme Court in 1972 Prime Minister Sirimavo Bandaranaike, leader of the SLFP. He held that position until 1978 when the new constitution removed all serving Supreme Court and High Court judges from office.
