= Joseph Vaz =

Oratorian priest and missionary (1651–1711)

Saint Joseph Vaz C.O.
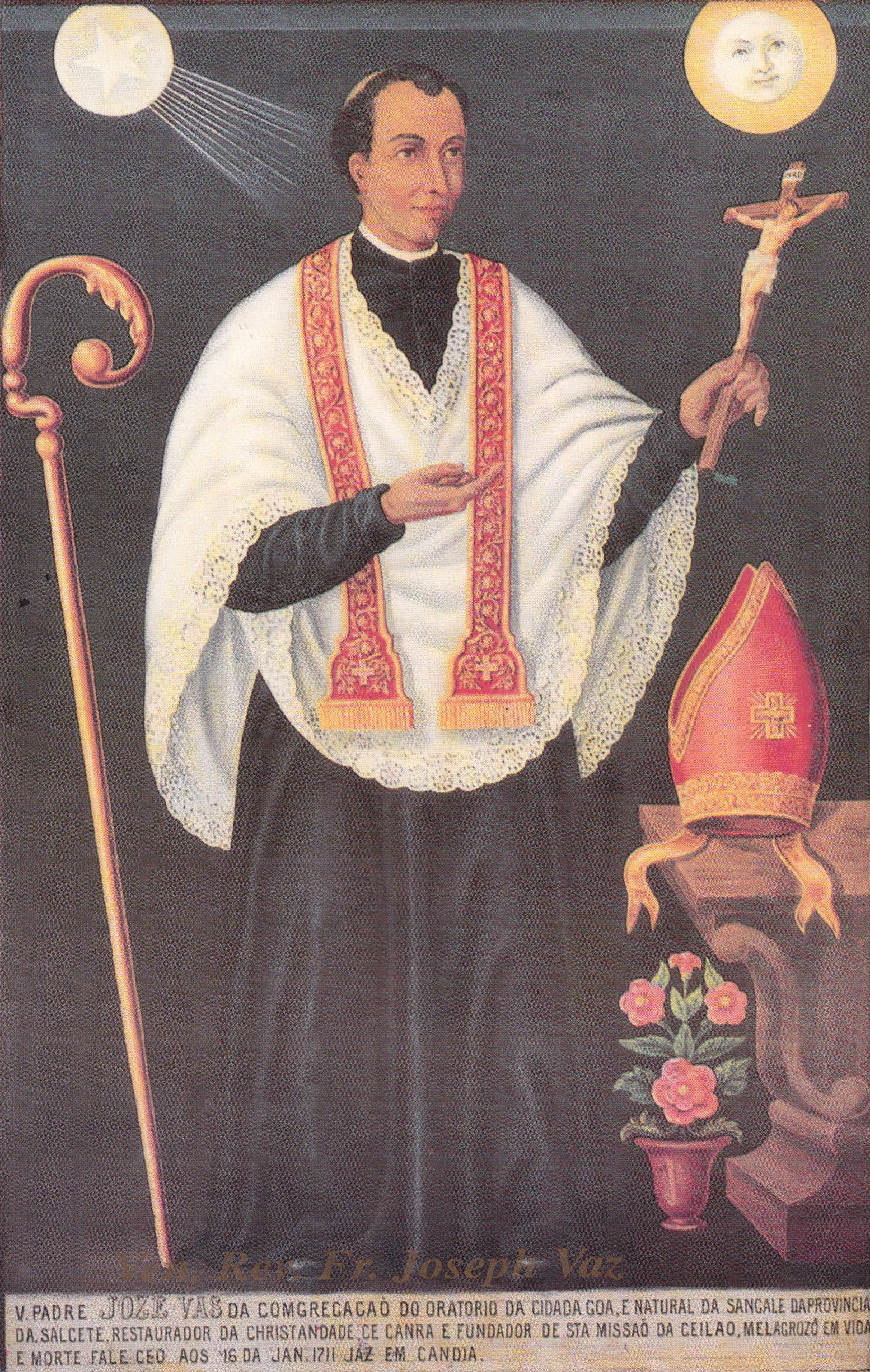
- Apostle of Sri Lanka, Apostle of Canara & Patron of Goa

Priest and Missionary, Apostle of Sri Lanka
- Born: 21 April 1651; Benaulim, Goa, Portuguese India
- Died: 16 January 1711 (aged 59); Kandy, Dutch Ceylon
- Venerated in: Catholic Church
- Beatified: 21 January 1995, Galle Face Green, Colombo, Sri Lanka by Pope John Paul II
- Canonized: 14 January 2015, Galle Face Green, Colombo, Sri Lanka by Pope Francis
- Feast: 16 January
- Attributes: Mitre placed to side, holding crucifix, sun icon, Oratorian habit
- Patronage: Sri Lanka; Archdiocese of Goa and Daman

Joseph Vaz CO (21 April 1651 – 16 January 1711) was a Oratorian priest and missionary in Dutch Ceylon (now Sri Lanka). Originally from Sancoale in Portuguese Goa, Vaz arrived in Ceylon during the Dutch occupation, a time when the Dutch had banned Catholicism in Ceylon and imposed Calvinism as the official religion after taking control from the Portuguese Empire.

He travelled throughout the island bringing the Eucharist and the Sacraments to clandestine groups of crypto-Catholics. Later in his mission, he found shelter in the Kingdom of Kandy where he was able to work freely. By the time of his death, Vaz had managed to rebuild the Catholic Church on the island.

As a result of his labors, Vaz is known as the Apostle of Ceylon. On 21 January 1995, he was beatified by Pope John Paul II in Colombo. He was canonized on 14 January 2015 by Pope Francis in an open-air Mass ceremony at the Galle Face Green in Colombo.

== Early life ==
The third of six children, Vaz was born in 1651 at Benaulim, his mother's village in Goa, then known as Portuguese India. His parents, Cristóvão Vaz and Maria de Miranda, were devout Catholics. Cristóvão belonged to a prominent Naik family of Sancoale.

Vaz attended the elementary school in Sancoale. He learned Portuguese in Sancoale and Latin in Benaulim. He was a bright pupil and respected by his teachers and fellow students. He made such rapid progress in his studies that his father decided to send him to the city of Velha Goa for further studies; where he did a course in rhetoric and humanities at the Jesuits' College of St. Paul. He further studied philosophy and theology at the St. Thomas Aquinas Academy, run by the Dominicans.

In 1675, Vaz was ordained a deacon for the Archdiocese of Goa by Custódio de Pinho, the Vicar Apostolic of Bijapur and Golconda. In 1676, he was ordained a priest by the Archbishop of Goa, António Brandão, S.O.Cist. Soon after his ordination, he started going barefoot to live like the poor and acquired a reputation as a popular preacher and confessor. He opened a Latin school in Sancoale for prospective seminarians. In 1677 he consecrated himself as a "slave of Mary", sealing it with a document known as the "Deed of Bondage".

== Ministry in Canara (1681–1684) ==
Vaz wanted to serve as a missionary in Ceylon, and therefore presented his request to go there to the cathedral chapter, which was administering the diocese following the vacancy created by the death of Brandão on 6 July 1678. However, the cathedral chapter proposed to him to go to Canara instead, where the Padroado authorities in Goa were in conflict with the local authorities belonging to the Sacred Congregation of Propaganda Fide, the Vatican agency for missionary efforts worldwide. Vaz was appointed the Vicar Forane of Canara by the Padroado in 1681, and sent with the purpose of asserting their jurisdiction against the Propaganda Fide. The chapter also gave him the esteemed title of "Frame of Canara". Upon his arrival, he found the situation of the Roman Catholic Church there to be highly explosive.

The Padroado authorities in Goa were at conflict with those of the Propaganda Fide in Canara, led by the already incumbent Vicar Forane, Bishop Thomas de Castro. The source of the conflict was that De Castro's appointment as Vicar Forane of Canara by Pope Clement X on 30 August 1675 was not recognised by the preceding Padroado archbishop. Consequently, they did not cede the jurisdiction to him despite the pope's letter of appointment.

The Padroado–Propaganda conflict which ensued divided the Catholics of Canara into two sides—those who recognised the authority of the Padroado archbishop in Goa versus those who supported De Castro. Those who recognised the authority of the Padroado were excommunicated by De Castro, while those who recognised the authority of the Propaganda were excommunicated by the Padroado authorities at Goa. Both groups were forbidden from receiving sacraments from the priests of the rival group, on penalty of excommunication.

In a letter dated 14 September 1681, Vaz lamented: "Many in fact believe that the Catholic Church is divided, and that we and the Bishop's priests are not children of the same Mother Church; and that our doctrines and our sacraments are different; and what the ones do, the others destroy. Thus the Catholic Church is much despised and is not acceptable."

With great diplomacy and humility, Vaz met De Castro at Mangalore and after having convinced himself of the legitimacy of the documents, brought about a truce until a direction was received from the new pope, Innocent XI. In light of the fact that the bishop had legitimate authority, Vaz recognised his authority and while continuing to adhere to the Padroado system, zealously worked for the religious welfare of the people. The bishop further agreed to delegate jurisdiction to him conditionally. Vaz often spoke to him and pleaded with him not to issue so many excommunications, but to wait for a final decision from the pope. He pointed out that the Hindus were scandalised and the Christians bewildered by these arguments.

During his stay, Vaz undertook serious missionary activities in Canara from 1681 to 1684, carrying out a lot of missionary work in Mangalore, Coondapur, Basroor, Barcoor, Moolki, Kallianpur and other areas, and reviving the spirits and faith of the widely scattered Roman Catholic community. He reconstructed the Rosario Cathedral in Mangalore and built new churches at Onore, Basroor, Cundapore, and Gangolim. He also set up small schools in some of the villages with the co-operation of their residents.

Vaz's most important contribution, however, was the establishment of a large number of Irmidades (Confraternities) throughout Canara, where he would periodically celebrate festive occasions with great pomp. Vaz was compelled to do so due to a shortage of priests, and as such an Irmidade brought together the Catholics of a place where there was no church or resident priest. To this end, he constructed small huts and asked the local Catholics to gather there and recite their prayers. This greatly helped to keep alive and encourage the religious fervor for Christianity.

In his short stay, Vaz acquired a great and saintly reputation. He did yeoman service to the cause of the upliftment of the downtrodden. Many miracles are attributed to him. A local legend has it that while serving as parish priest of Our Lady of Mercy parish, Paneer, a few kilometres from Mudipu, Bantwal, a few Hindus arrived in the night, asking him to accompany them to administer final sacraments to a sick parishioner in the neighbourhood of Mudipu.

The men had conspired to slay the priest, due to his tireless missionary activities. When they reached the top of the Hill, the men tried to kill him. The serene Vaz knelt down on the rock and held his stick straight on the ground. A light flashed in their midst and the men could see water gushing from the spots where he knelt. Owing to this miracle, the men fled from the scene and Vaz returned to the parish unharmed. A shrine dedicated to him was constructed at that very site at Mudipu. It is visited annually by thousands of pilgrims and devotees, seeking blessings and cures for various ailments.

The new archbishop, Manuel de Sousa e Menezes, arrived in Goa and was displeased with Vaz on account of the agreement he had made with De Castro.

== Oratorian ==
When Vaz returned to Goa, he spent his time preaching in the surrounding villages. He also joined a group of priests of the archdiocese who had decided to live together in a religious community. The group was formally erected as a community of the Congregation of the Oratory of St. Philip Neri on 25 September 1685, the first native religious community in the diocese. They took charge of the Church of the Holy Cross of Miracles, where they established their residence.

== Dutch Ceylon mission (1687–1711) ==
Hearing of the distressful situation of the Catholics of Ceylon who reportedly had no priests for many years, Vaz desired to go to their rescue. But instead he was named Superior of the Canara Mission, a post which he occupied for three years. In 1686, Vaz obtained permission to give up this office and to proceed to Ceylon.

Vaz carried his mission to the main centres of the island. Between 1687 and 1711, he was at the head of a group of Goan Bamonn priests who under his leadership and inspiration, mixed and moved about under cover sustaining the persecuted Roman Catholic population in Ceylon.

Vaz returned to Kandy in 1699 with a fellow priest, Joseph de Carvalho, who had been expelled at the instigation of Buddhist monks. He completed the construction of his new church, and went into service for the king, translating Portuguese books into Sinhala. From this vantage point, Vaz intensified his ministry, and converted some Sinhalese notables. New missionaries arrived in 1705, which enabled him to organise the mission into eight districts, each led by a priest. He worked on the creation of Catholic literature comparable to that of the Buddhists, and to affirm the rights of Catholics with those of the Dutch Calvinist Government. He was assisted by Jacome Gonsalves. Vaz humbly declined the offer made to him in 1705, to be the bishop and first Vicar Apostolic of Ceylon, preferring to remain a simple missionary. For this reason, he is often depicted with a mitre beside him.

=== Batticaloa mission ===
Joseph Vaz visited Batticaloa in 1710 in order to revive the Catholic faith during the time of Dutch persecution against Catholics. He visited a church in Thandavenveli, now known as Church of Our Lady of Presentation, where he was tied to a tree and beaten. Again, he made a second visit to Batticaloa for reviving the Catholic faith and returned to Kandy.

== Death ==
He died at Kandy on 16 January 1711, aged 59.

== Veneration ==
In October 2013, a Diocesan Inquiry of a miracle attributed to Vaz took place. In November 2013, Patriarch Filipe Neri Ferrao stated that the cause for Vaz's canonisation had reached a 'crucial stage'. The pope approved the vote by the Ordinary Session of Cardinals and Bishops in favor of canonization of the Indian-born priest and decided to summon a consistory shortly after.

Pope Francis waived the requirement for a second miracle, generally a requirement for canonization. The pope used the same process he used to canonize Pope John XXIII—without a second miracle attributed to his intercession. On 17 September 2014, Pope Francis approved the decision of the Congregation for the Causes of Saints, to canonise Joseph Vaz and the Vatican announced that "the Apostle of Sri Lanka", would be canonised during Pope Francis' visit to Sri Lanka in January 2015.

Joseph Vaz was canonized by Pope Francis on 14 January 2015 in Colombo at Galleface, Sri Lanka. Joseph Vaz is the first saint to have been canonised in Sri Lanka, the first saint of Sri Lanka (having died there) and first originally from the area of Goa, India.

The canonization of Joseph Vaz was celebrated at the St Joseph Vaz Shrine, Mudipu, Mangalore, during 14–16 January 2015, as he was the first priest from the Konkan Coast to be canonized.

== Legacy ==
In Karnataka, there is a parish dedicated to Vaz in Mudipu and in Sri Lanka, there is a chapel under his patronage in a remote village called Aluthwewa, about 10 miles off Galewela, in the Parish of Wahakotte.

== Bibliography ==
=== Primary ===
Rebelo, Fr. Eremito M., ed. (2011). Letters of Blessed Joseph Vaz: Son of Goa, Apostle of Canara and Sri Lanka. Goa: Committee for the cause of Canonization of Bl. Joseph Vaz.

=== Secondary ===
- Mascarenhas, Michael, SDB. Through Storm and Tempest: A Biography of Blessed Joseph Vaz, Apostle of Canara and Sri Lanka (1651 – 1711) and an Account of the Historic Exploits of the First Oratorians (Goa...) in Sri Lanka. Mumbai: Tej-prasarini Don Bosco Communications, 2001.
- Mascarenhas, Michael, SDB. Bhaktivant Jose Vazachem Caritravarnan: Kanara and Sri Lankecho preshit (1651–1711) ani Goemcya pratham Oratorian Sansthen Sri Lankat kel'lea caritrik missao vavracho vivar. Tr. into Konkani (Kannada script) by Reginald Pinto, Santosh Menezes, OFM Cap. and Victor Rodrigues. Mumbai: Tej-prasarini Don Bosco Communications, 2002.
- Mascarenhas, Michael, SDB. Vadoll ani tufananantlean: Goencho bhagevont put Padri Juze Vazachea jivitachi kotha. Translation into Konkani (Roman script) by Thomas Misquith and Jess Fernandes. Panjim: Boskon Communications, 2010.
- Mascarenhas, Michael, SDB. Vadalvara va tufanatun: Dhanyavadit Joseph Vaz yanche jivan caritra. Translation into Marathi by Anil Dabre. Mumbai: Tej-prasarini Don Bosco Communications, 2006.
- Cabral e Sa, Mario, & Lourdes Bravo da Costa Rodrigues, Great Goans. Vol. 1: Abbe Faria, Fr Jose Vaz, Lata Mangeshkar, T.B. Cunha. N.N.A.P. Publications, 1986.
- Don Peter, W.L.A. Studies in Ceylon Church History. Colombo: Catholic Press, 1963.
- Don Peter, W.L.A. Historical Gleanings. Colombo, n.p., 1992.
- Gomes, Manuel. Blessed Joseph Vaz: A Creative Missionary Ahead of His Time. Old Goa: Manuel P. Gomes, Pastoral Institute St Pius X, 2010.
- Goonetileke, H.A.I. A Bibliography of Ceylon. 5 vols. Zug: Switzerland, 1975–1983.
- Pereira, Denis G. Blessed Joseph Vaz, the Man, His Mission, His Message. Bopmbay: Pauline, c. 1996.
- Perera, S.G. Life of Blessed Joseph Vaz: Apostle of Sri Lanka. Ontario: Humanics Universal Inc., 2011. [Reprinted in Goa by Eremito M. Rebelo.]
- Perera, S.G., ed. The Oratorian Mission in Ceylon: Historical Documents relating to the Life and Labours of the Venerable Father Joseph Vaz, his Companions and Successors. Colombo: Caxton Printing Works, 1936.
- Perniola, V. The Catholic Church in Sri Lanka: The Dutch Period. 2 vols. Dehiwala: Tissara Prakasakayo, 1983.
- Perniola, V., tr. The Catholic Church in Sri Lanka. The Portuguese Period: Original Documents. Ceylon Historical Journal monograph series 15–16. Dehiwala: Tissara Prakasakayo 1989–(1991). [1:77.]
- Wickremasinghe, Martin. Landmarks of Sinhalese Literature. Colombo: Gunasena, 1948/1963.
- Gomes, Luis. Boddvo Iadnik.
- Costa, Cosme. A letter from Joseph Vaz.
- Do Rego, Sebastiao. Vida do Veneravel Padre Jose Vaz.
