= N. Nadarajah =

Justice N. Nadarajah KC

Puisne Justice of the Supreme Court of Ceylon

Personal details
- Born: 1897
- Education: St. Patrick's College, Jaffna; St. Joseph's College, Colombo; Ceylon Law College
- Profession: Lawyer
- Ethnicity: Ceylon Tamil

Justice Namasivayam Nadarajah was a Ceylon Tamil lawyer and judge of the Supreme Court of Ceylon.

== Early life and family ==
Nadarajah was born in 1897. His father was Veerakathipillai Namasivayam, a surveyor. His family were from Valanthalai near Karainagar in northern Ceylon. He was educated at St. Patrick's College, Jaffna and St. Joseph's College, Colombo. After school he joined Ceylon Law College, qualifying as an advocate.

Nadarajah married Thangammah, daughter of Kanagasabai.

== Career ==
After qualifying Nadarajah practised law at the Colombo bar. He was later appointed a judge of the Supreme Court of Ceylon.

Nadarajah died in the 1950s.
