= St James' Church, Vidathaltheevu =

Roman Catholic church in Vidattaltivu, Mannar, Sri Lanka

St James' Church is an historic Roman Catholic church in Vidattaltivu village in Mannar District in Sri Lanka.

== History ==
According to Rev. Fr. Antonainus's book of The Chronicle of the Sanctuary of Our Lady of Madhu, St James Church is over 400 years old. The Franciscan historian Friar Paulo da Trinidade (1571-1651) stated that Franciscan monks build St James Church before 1594.

Catholic Sri Lankans settled in Vidattaltivu from Jaffna, Navaali, and Allaipitti, and the church was built to accommodate them.

From 1948 St James Church was run under Iranaitheevu parish. The priests traveled by boat from Iranaitheevu by boat to perform mass and other duties at St. James. Then the church was moved under the Adampan parish. Now it is Vidathaltheevu parish.

== See also ==
- St. Sebastian's Cathedral, Mannar
