= Tissa Balasuriya =

Sri Lankan Catholic priest and theologian

Tissa Balasuriya (Sinhala: තිස්ස බාලසූරිය) (August 29, 1924 – January 17, 2013) was a Sri Lankan Catholic priest and theologian.

== Biography ==
Balasuriya was educated at St. Patrick's College, Jaffna. In 1971, Balasuriya founded the Center for Society and Religion; four years later, he founded the Ecumenical Association of Third World Theologians.

=== Doctrinal investigation and excommunication ===
In 1990, Balasuriya published the book Mary and Human Liberation. In 1994, the Sri Lankan bishops warned that the book included heretical content because it misrepresented the doctrine of original sin and cast serious doubts on the divinity of Christ. Balasuriya submitted a 55-page theological defense to the Congregation for the Doctrine of the Faith (CDF), which rejected it.

In May 1996, the Congregation demanded that Balasuriya sign a profession of faith, apparently written exclusively for him, stating that he would "adhere with religious submission of will and intellect to the teachings of the Roman pontiff," even those teachings not proclaimed as definitive.

Balasuriya responded by signing a different profession of faith composed by Pope Paul VI, adding a caveat that he was signing it "in the context of theological development and church practice since Vatican II and the freedom and responsibility of Christians and theological searchers under canon law." Cardinal Joseph Ratzinger, head of the CDF, ruled that the caveat rendered the profession "defective." Balasuriya appealed directly to Pope John Paul II, but was excommunicated on 2 January 1997, with the Pope's approval. Balasuriya appealed to the Apostolic Signatura but was told that his case could not go forward.

==== Lifting of excommunication ====
Balasuriya subsequently agreed to drop the caveat from his profession of faith, and after intense international publicity and six days of negotiations, the excommunication was rescinded in January 1998. Although Balasuriya did not admit to doctrinal error, he did acknowledge "perceptions of error" and agreed to submit all future writings to his bishops for the imprimatur.

== Death ==
Balasuriya died in Colombo on January 17, 2013, aged 89. He had been suffering from illness for some time. His funeral was held on January 18, 2013, at the General Cemetery in Borella after a funeral Mass at the Fatima Church.

== See also ==
- Balangoda Ananda Maitreya Thero
- Marcelline Jayakody
- W.D. Amaradeva
- Sisira Senaratne
