= S. M. Manickarajah =

Ceylon Tamil politician and Member of Parliament

Hon. S. M. Manickarajah
- சு. ம. மாணிக்கராஜா

Member of the Ceylonese Parliament for Trincomalee
- In office 1963–1970
- Preceded by: R. N. Rajavarothiam
- Succeeded by: B. Neminathan

Personal details
- Born: 15 May 1908
- Ethnicity: Ceylon Tamil

Supramanian Mylvaganam Manickarajah was a Ceylon Tamil politician and Member of Parliament.

Manickarajah was born on 15 May 1908.

Manickarajah was the Illankai Tamil Arasu Kachchi's (Federal Party) candidate at the November 1963 by-election in Trincomalee held following the death of incumbent R. N. Rajavarothiam. He won the election and entered Parliament. He was re-elected at the 1965 parliamentary election.
