= B. Neminathan =

Ceylon Tamil politician

Hon. B. Neminathan MP

Member of the Ceylonese Parliament for Trincomalee
- In office 1970–1977
- Preceded by: S. M. Manickarajah
- Succeeded by: R. Sampanthan

Personal details
- Born: 28 March 1922
- Died: Died before 1984
- Ethnicity: Ceylon Tamil

Balasubramaniam Neminathan (born 28 March 1922, died before 1984) was a Ceylon Tamil politician who served as a Member of Parliament.

Neminathan was born in March 1922. He stood as the Illankai Tamil Arasu Kachchi's (Federal Party) candidate for Trincomalee at the 1970 parliamentary election. He won the election and entered Parliament. In a 1984 publication by his successor R. Sampanthan, it was noted that B. Neminathan is deceased.
