= Harry Sandrasagra =

Harry Sandrasagra MLC KC

Member of the Legislative Council of Ceylon

Personal details
- Born: 12 June 1875
- Died: 29 September 1940 (aged 65)
- Education: St. Patrick's College, Jaffna
- Profession: Lawyer
- Ethnicity: Ceylon Tamil

Henry Alexander Patrick Sandrasagra (12 June 1875 – 29 September 1940) was a Ceylonese lawyer and member of the Legislative Council of Ceylon.

== Early life and family ==
Sandrasagra was born on 12 June 1875. He was the son of J. N. Sandrasagra, Superintendent of Minor Roads, Jaffna. Sandrasagra was educated at St. Patrick's College, Jaffna.

Sandrasagra married Josephine, daughter of Simon Cherubim. They had a son (Wilfred) and two daughters. He also had a son Ariaratnam from his first marriage.

== Career ==
Sandrasagra joined the legal profession in 1898, working at the Jaffna Bar. He later moved to the Colombo Bar and was appointed King's Counsel in 1924.

Sandrasagra was president of the National Association and the Ceylon National Congress.

== Later life ==
Sandrasagra was appointed to the Legislative Council of Ceylon in 1929. He died on 29 September 1940.
