= Rayappu Joseph =

Sri Lankan Tamil bishop (1940–2021)

Rt Rev. Rayappu Joseph
- Bishop of Mannar
- Native name: இராயப்பு யோசப்
- Church: Roman Catholic Church
- Archdiocese: Colombo
- Diocese: Mannar
- Installed: 6 July 1992
- Term ended: 14 January 2016
- Predecessor: Thomas Savundaranayagam

Personal details
- Born: 16 April 1940 Delft, Ceylon
- Died: 1 April 2021 (aged 80) Jaffna, Sri Lanka
- Buried: St. Sebastian's Cathedral, Mannar
- Education: Pontifical Urbaniana University

Bishop Rayappu Joseph (Tamil: இராயப்பு யோசப்; 16 April 1940 – 1 April 2021) was a Sri Lanka Tamil prelate and the Roman Catholic Bishop of Mannar.

== Early life and family ==
Joseph was born on 16 April 1940 on the island of Neduntheevu in northern Ceylon to a practitioner of indigenous medicine. Living in Cheddikulam and Mannar during his early childhood, he was educated at St. Patrick's College, Jaffna. Joseph had a Doctor of Canon Law degree from the Pontifical Urbaniana University.

== Career ==
Joseph was ordained a priest in December 1967. He was a professor at the St Xavier's Seminary, Jaffna. In July 1992 he was appointed Bishop of Mannar and was ordained a bishop in October 1992.

Joseph has been a vocal critic of the Sri Lankan government/Sri Lankan military's conduct during the Sri Lankan Civil War and the country's human rights record. This has led to him being threatened by government supporters.

Catholic Church titles
Preceded by Thomas Savundaranayagam	Bishop of Mannar; 6 July 1992 – 14 January 2016	Succeeded by Kingsley Swampillai (as Apostolic Administrator)
