= Sancoale =

- Census town
- Façade of Igreja de Nossa Senhora de Saúde (1560)

- Location in Goa, India Sancoale (India)
- Coordinates: 15.37°N 73.90°E
- Country: India
- State: Goa
- District: South Goa
- First Settlement: 1560
- Founder: Jesuits

Government
  - Type: Village Panchayat
- Elevation: 41 m (135 ft)

Population (2011)
  - Total: 21,923

Languages
  - Official: Konkani
  - Former Official: Portuguese

Languages
- Time zone: UTC+5:30 (IST)
- PIN: 403710
- Vehicle registration: GA 07

Sancoale is a census town in South Goa district in the Indian state of Goa. It falls within the Sub-District of Mormugão and the Velhas Conquistas region. It is famous for being the hometown of Joseph Vaz, the patron saint of Sri Lanka.

== Churches ==
=== Igreja de Nossa Senhora de Saúde (1560) ===
It is also known as Our Lady of Health Church or the Old Church of Sancoale, in English. It was built by Jesuit missionaries who arrived at Sancoale in 1560 to settle there. By way of commemorating, their occupation they established the a chapel of Nossa Senhora de Saúde. The construction of the chapel was completed in 1566 and it was elevated to the level of a church in.

The Church building caught fire in 1834, and today only a part of the church's façade stands on the banks of the Zuari River, and can be seen even from the Agassaim – Cortalim Bridge. The façade of the church is typical of early Baroque architecture with composite Corinthian pilasters and bas-reliefs. The fan shaped quadrants are a variation on the quarter circle type form of a free flowing curve. Behind it is the new chapel of Our Lady of Health which was built in 1783 by Rev. Fr. Proto Faria.

The Portuguese Government had declared it a national monument on 19-Mar-1937. The Patron of Goa Blessed Joseph Vaz wrote his famed Letter of Bondage at this church in 1677.

A newer chapel of Our Lady of Health was built behind the façade, in 1783, by Rev. Fr. Proto Faria.

==== 2020 Saffron Controversy ====
On 30 December 2020, a group of Hindu immigrants trespassed the premises of the Old Church in order to perform Hindu rituals. These Hindus were met with resistance from the local residents. (Sancoale's native Goan population is entirely Catholic). However, the Goa police refused to file a First Information Report on the incident.

=== Igreja de Nossa Senhora de Saúde (1606) ===
A newer and larger church, with the same name was built inland in 1606.

== Geography ==
The average elevation is 41 metres (135 feet).

== Demographics ==
As of 2011 Indian census, Sancoale had a population of 21,923. Males constitute 53% of the population and females 47%. Sancoale has an average literacy rate of 86.61% lower than state average of 88.70%. Male literacy rate is 91.54%, and female literacy rate is 80.93%. In Sancoale, 12.28% of the population is under 6 years of age.
