= Leo Rajendram Antony =

Sri Lankan Roman Catholic bishop (1927-2012)

- Bishop of Trincomalee–Batticaloa
- Church: Catholic Church
- Diocese: Diocese of Trincomalee–Batticaloa
- In office: 15 February 1974 – 17 March 1983
- Predecessor: Ignatius Philip Trigueros Glennie
- Successor: Kingsley Swampillai
- Previous posts: Coadjutor Bishop of Trincomalee–Batticaloa (1972-1974); Titular Bishop of Fissiana (1968-1974); Auxiliary Bishop of Jaffna (1968-1972)

Orders
- Ordination: 7 December 1954 by Pietro Sigismondi
- Consecration: 21 November 1968 by Jerome Emilianuspillai

Personal details
- Born: 18 April 1927 Island of Ceylon and its Territories and Dependencies, British Empire
- Died: 3 December 2012 (aged 85)

Leo Rajendram Antony (18 April 1927 − 3 December 2012) was a Sri Lankan Roman Catholic bishop.

He studied at St Patrick's College, Jaffna, for nearly nine years (1940–1948). He was ordained a priest in 1954 and served at the Nallur Mission and then was selected to serve the bishop of Trinco/Batticolo as his secretary. Later he returned to Jaffna and was appointed a director of the Rosarian Ashram in Thologatty.

In 1966, he was appointed to the cathedral as a pastor and from there was chosen to be auxiliary bishop of Jaffna in 1968.

He was appointed Co-adjutor Bishop of Trinco-Batticolo in December 1972 and succeeded his bishop at Batticolo in 1974. Due to ill health he retired in 1983.
