= A. B. Rajendra =

Ceylon Tamil civil servant (1884–1963)

Senator A. B. Rajendra MBE

Member of the Senate of Ceylon

Personal details
- Born: 1884
- Died: 1963 (aged 78–79)
- Education: St. Patrick's College, Jaffna
- Profession: Civil servant
- Ethnicity: Ceylon Tamil

Mudaliyar Arulappu Bastiampillay Rajendra (1884–1963) was a Ceylon Tamil civil servant and member of the Senate of Ceylon.

== Early life and family ==
Rajendra was born in 1884. He was educated at St. Patrick's College, Jaffna.

Rajendra had seven children.

== Career ==
After school Rajendra joined the Government Clerical Service. After a series of promotions he became an Administrative Officer at the Education Department. He worked at the department for nearly 35 years.

Rajendra was an official translator for the government and Interpreter Mudaliyar to the British Governor. He was made a Member of the Order of the British Empire in the 1953 New Year Honours.

== Later life ==
After retirement Rajendra was appointed to the Senate of Ceylon. He died in 1963.
