= Noel Emmanuel =

Sri Lankan Tamil priest (born 1960)

Rt Rev. Noel Emmanuel
- Bishop of Trincomalee
- Church: Catholic Church
- Province: Colombo
- Diocese: Trincomalee
- Installed: 3 June 2015
- Predecessor: Kingsley Swampillai

Personal details
- Born: 25 December 1960 (age 65) Trincomalee, Ceylon

Christian Noel Emmanuel (born 25 December 1960) is a Sri Lankan Tamil priest and the current Bishop of Trincomalee.

== Early life and family ==
Emmanuel was born on 25 December 1960 in Trincomalee in eastern Ceylon. After school he joined St. Joseph's Minor Seminary before studying philosophy at the National Seminary of Kandy (1978–81). He then did regency with pastoral work (1981–82) before entering St. Paul's Major Seminary, Triruchirappally (1983–86).

== Career ==
Emmanuel was ordained as a deacon and priest on 12 March 1985 and 21 May 1986 respectively. He then held various positions: assistant priest in the Cathedral Parish, Batticaloa (1986–88); parish priest of the Church of Iruthayapuram, Batticaloa (1988–89); parish priest of the Church of Our Lady of Good Health, Akkaraipattu (1989–93); and Director of the Catechetical, Biblical and Liturgical Apostolate, Batticaloa (1993–99). Between 1999 and 2001 he studied at the Pontifical Urban University. On returning to Sri Lanka he served as professor at the National Seminary in Kandy (2001–11). In 2011 he was appointed episcopal vicar of the Diocese of Trincomalee-Batticaloa. He became general treasurer of the diocese in 2012. On 3 June 2015 he became Bishop of Trincomalee.
