= St. Sebastian's Cathedral, Mannar =

Roman Catholic cathedral in Mannar, Sri Lanka

St. Sebastian's Cathedral
- Mannar Cathedral
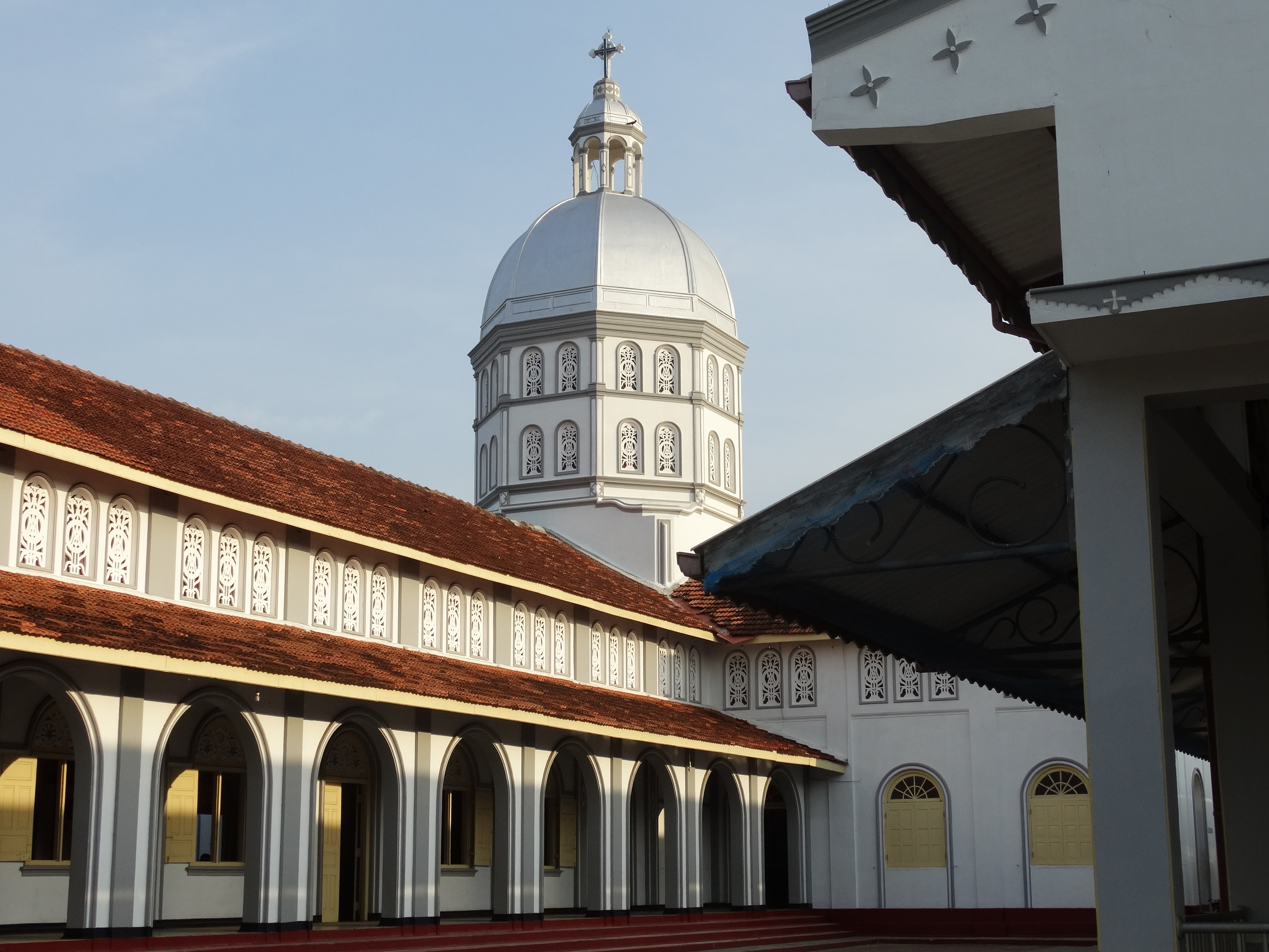

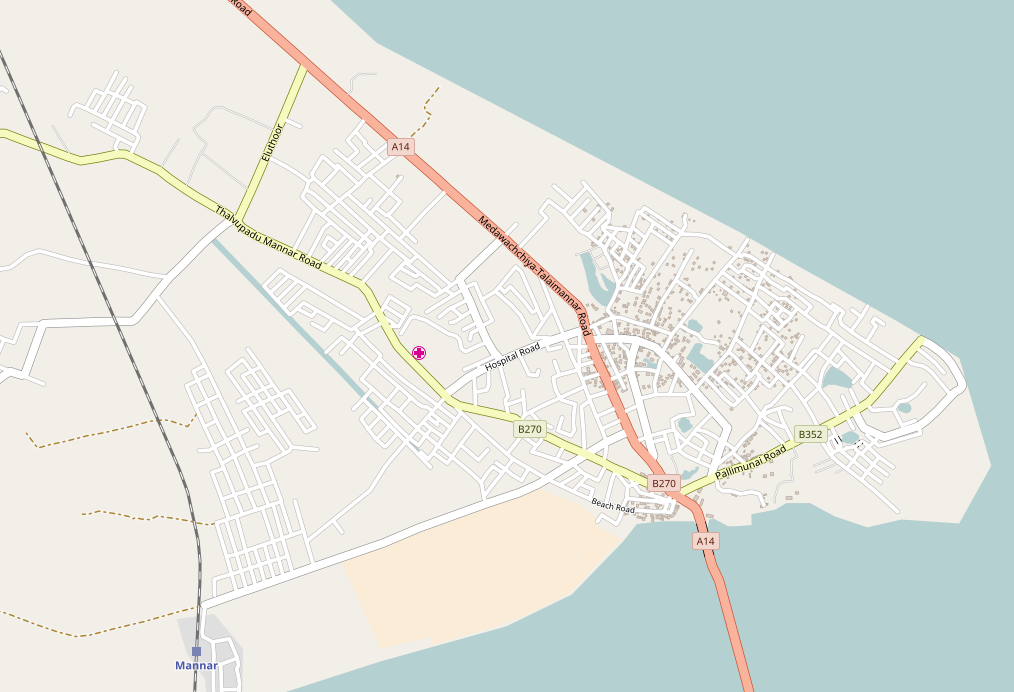
- Location in Mannar
- 08°58′46.10″N 79°54′25.90″E
- Location: Mannar
- Country: Sri Lanka
- Denomination: Roman Catholic

History
- Status: Cathedral

Architecture
- Functional status: Active

Administration
- Archdiocese: Colombo
- Diocese: Mannar

Clergy
- Bishop: Emmanuel Fernando

St. Sebastian's Cathedral is the seat of the Roman Catholic Diocese of Mannar located in Mannar, Sri Lanka.

== See also ==
- St James' Church, Vidathaltheevu
