= Diocese of Mannar =

Latin Catholic diocese in Sri Lanka

Coordinates: 8.9797°N 79.9074°E

Diocese of Mannar Dioecesis Mannarensis மன்னார் மறைமாவட்டம
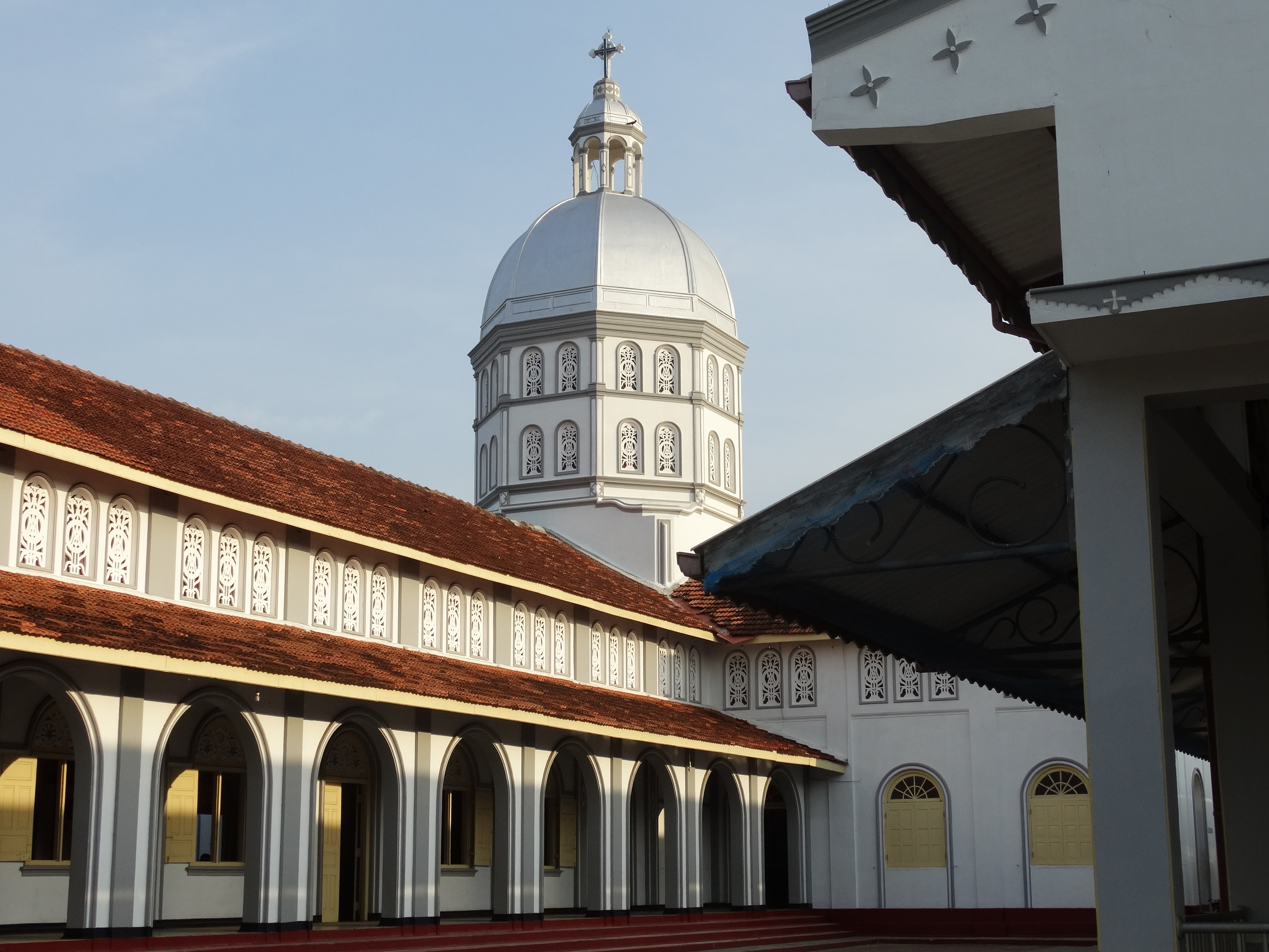
- St. Sebastian's Cathedral

Location
- Country: Sri Lanka
- Ecclesiastical province: Colombo
- Metropolitan: Colombo

Statistics
- Area: 3,998 km^{2} (1,544 sq mi)
- Population: Total; Catholics: (as of 2023); 448,821; 94,111 (21.0%)
- Parishes: 50

Information
- Denomination: Catholic Church
- Sui iuris church: Latin Church
- Rite: Roman Rite
- Established: 24 January 1981; 45 years ago
- Cathedral: St Sebastian’s Cathedral in Mannar
- Patron saint: Our Lady of Madhu
- Secular priests: 77 (76 Diocesan, 1 Religious Orders)

Current leadership
- Pope: Leo XIV
- Bishop: Gnanapragasam Anthonypillai
- Metropolitan Archbishop: Malcolm Ranjith
- Bishops emeritus: Fidelis Fernando

Map
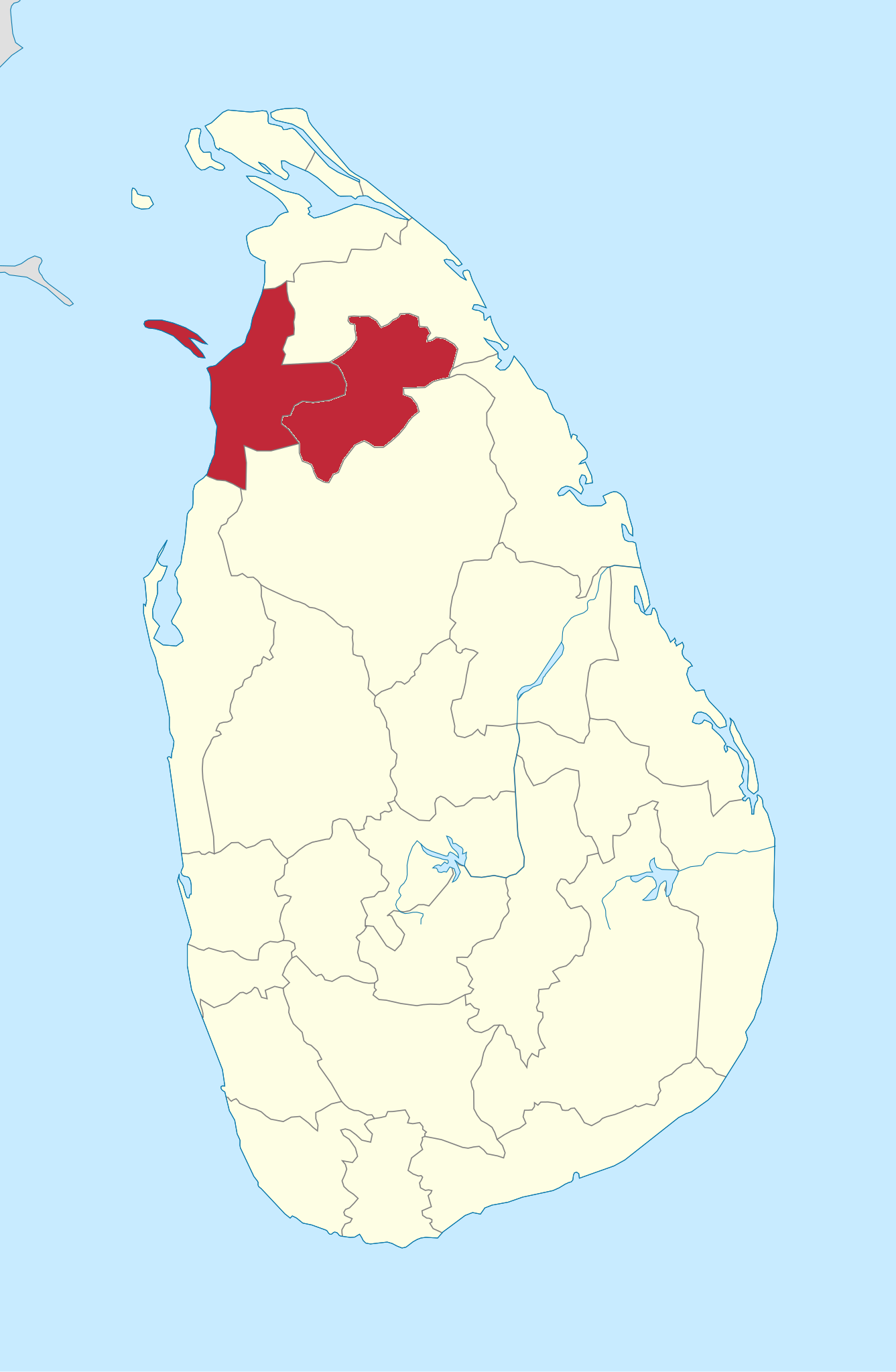

The Diocese of Mannar (Latin: Dioecesis Mannarensis) is a Latin Catholic diocese in north-western Sri Lanka, administered by the Bishop of Mannar, currently Fidelis Fernando.

== History ==
The Diocese of Mannar was created on 24 January 1981 from parts of the Diocese of Jaffna. Between 14 January 2016 and 22 November 2017, the position of Bishop remained vacant, the diocese being overseen by Apostolic Administrator and retired Bishop Kingsley Swampillai.

== Leadership ==
Bishops of Mannar (Roman Rite)

- Thomas Savundaranayagam (24 January 1981 – 6 July 1992), appointed Bishop of Jaffna
- Rayappu Joseph (6 July 1992 – 14 January 2016), retired
  - Apostolic Administrator Kingsley Swampillai (14 January 2016 – 30 December 2017), Bishop of Trincomalee
- Fidelis Fernando (22 November 2017 – 14 December 2024), retired
- Gnanapragasam Anthonypillai (14 December 2024 – Present)

== Notable Churches ==
1. Shrine of Our Lady of Madhu
2. St. Sebastian's Cathedral, Mannar
3. St.Antony's Church, Nedunkandal
4. Our lady of Refuge Church, Ithikandal
5. Our lady of Velankani Church, Thamari Kulam, Adampan
6. St.Philip Neto's Church, Kannady
7. The Sacred Heart Church, Adampan
8. Our lady of Sorrows Church, Adampan
9. St. Antony's Church, Karukkakulam
10. Karthar Kovil, Adampan
11. St. Joseph Church, Andankulam
12. St.Michel's Church, Tharavankoddai
13. St.Joseph Vazz Church, Kallikulam
14. St. Francis Xavier Shrine, Velankulam
15. St.Lawrence Church, Thalimanar
16. Holy Rosary Church, Thalaimannar
17. Christ the King Church, Santhapuram
18. St.Anne's Church, Vankalai

== See also ==
- Mannar Catholic martyrs (1544)
