= N. R. Rajavarothiam =

Ceylon Tamil politician and Member of Parliament

Hon. N. R. Rajavarothiam

Member of the Ceylonese Parliament for Trincomalee
- In office 1952–1963
- Preceded by: S. Sivapalan
- Succeeded by: S. M. Manickarajah

Personal details
- Born: 8 October 1908
- Died: 27 August 1963 (aged 54)
- Party: Illankai Tamil Arasu Kachchi
- Education: St. Joseph's College; Ananda College; Ceylon University College
- Ethnicity: Ceylon Tamil

Navaratnasingam Ratnavarothiam Rajavarothiam (8 October 1908 – 27 August 1963), commonly known as N. R. Rajavarothiam, was a Ceylon Tamil politician and Member of Parliament.

== Early life ==
Rajavarothiam was the son of Navaratnasingam, from Trincomalee in eastern British Ceylon. He was educated at St. Joseph's College, Trincomalee and Ananda College, Colombo. He later entered Ceylon University College. He was the chief trustee of Muttucumarswamy Temple.

Rajavarothiam married Sivayohanayaki. They had two sons.

== Political career ==
Rajavarothiam joined the Illankai Tamil Arasu Kachchi (Federal Party) and became an active member of the party. He became vice president of the party. He was ITAK's candidate for Trincomalee at the 1952 parliamentary election. He won the election and entered Parliament, where he was one of only two ITAK MPs. He was re-elected at the 1956, March 1960 and July 1960 parliamentary elections.
