= S. Sivapalan =

Ceylon Tamil politician and Member of Parliament

Hon. S. Sivapalan MP

Member of the Ceylonese Parliament for Trincomalee
- In office 20 September 1947 – 30 May 1952
- Succeeded by: N. R. Rajavarothiam, ITAK

Personal details
- Born: c. 1890
- Died: 1960
- Education: Wesleyan Mission English School; St. Patrick's College; Wesley College
- Ethnicity: Ceylon Tamil

Subramaniam Sivapalan was a Ceylon Tamil politician and Member of Parliament.

== Early life ==
Sivapalan was born around 1890. He was the son of M. Subramaniam, a Secretary of the District Court in Trincomalee in eastern British Ceylon. He was educated at the Wesleyan Mission English School, Trincomalee, St. Patrick's College, Jaffna and Wesley College, Colombo. He joined the Government Clerical Service.

Sivapalan was appointed Vanniya (chief headman) of Kaddukulam Pattu Division in 1935. Later he was appointed Vanniya of Thampalakamam Division.

Sivapalan married Bagavathy, daughter of Somasundaram. They had five sons (Sivarajan, Sundararajan, Sriskantharajah, Varatharajan and Ganeshan) and one daughter (Vimaladevi).

== Political career ==
Sivapalan was the All Ceylon Tamil Congress's candidate for Trincomalee at the 1947 parliamentary election. He won the election and entered Parliament. He stood for re-election at the 1952 parliamentary election but was defeated by the Illankai Tamil Arasu Kachchi candidate N.R. Rajavarothiam.
