= Diocese of Batticaloa =

Latin Catholic diocese in Sri Lanka

Coordinates: 7.7124°N 81.6961°E

Diocese of Batticaloa Dioecesis Batticaloaensis மட்டக்களப்பு மறைமாவட்டம்
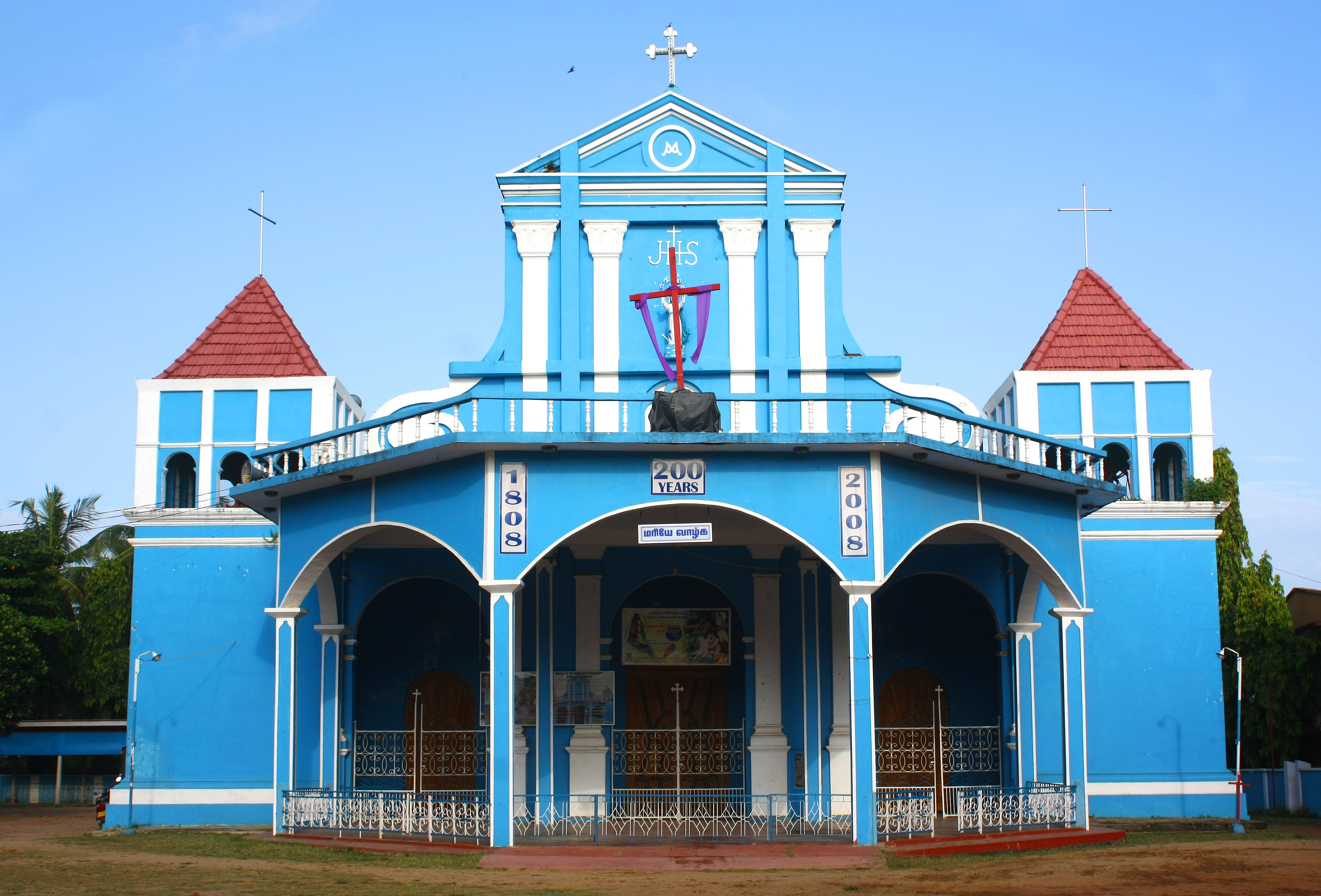
- St. Mary's Cathedral, Batticaloa

Location
- Country: Sri Lanka
- Ecclesiastical province: Colombo
- Metropolitan: Colombo

Statistics
- Area: 7,269 km^{2} (2,807 sq mi)
- Population: Total; Catholics: (as of 2012); 1,199,966; 55,225 (4.6%)

Information
- Denomination: Catholic Church
- Sui iuris church: Latin Church
- Rite: Roman Rite
- Established: 3 July 2012
- Cathedral: St. Mary's Cathedral, Batticaloa

Current leadership
- Pope: Leo XIV
- Metropolitan Archbishop: Malcolm Ranjith
- Apostolic Administrator: Anton Ranjith Pillainayagam

Map
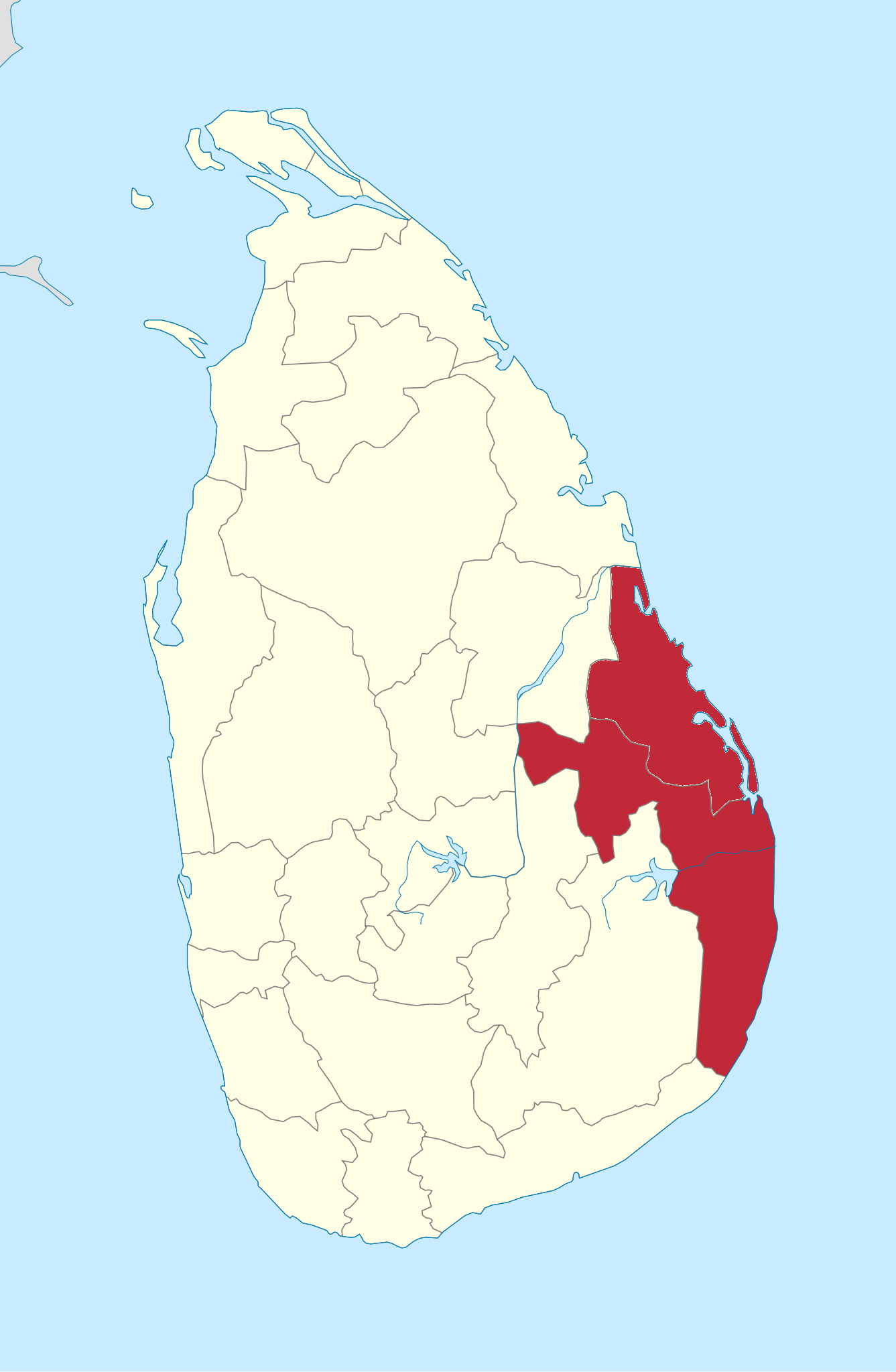

The Diocese of Batticaloa (Latin: Dioecesis Batticaloaensis,Tamil: மட்டக்களப்பு மறைமாவட்டம்) is a Latin Catholic diocese for south-eastern Sri Lanka.

== History ==
The Diocese of Batticaloa was created on 3 July 2012 from parts of the Diocese of Trincomalee-Batticaloa. The first and oldest church of this diocese is Church of Our Lady of Presentation.

== Parishes and Churches ==
The diocese has 19 parishes in Batticaloa deanery and 7 in Kalmunai deanery. It has 7 shrines such as St. Antony's shrine (Puliyanthivu), Our Lady of Fátima shrine (Inginiyagala), Our Lady of the Rosary shrine (Periya Pullumalai), Our Lady of Perpetual Help shrine (Aayithiyamalai), Our Lady of Little Lourdes shrine (Navatkudah), Holy Cross shrine (Sorikkalmunai) and St. Judas Thaddaeus shrine (Thettathivu).

== Bishops ==
#	Bishop	Took office	Left office
1st	Joseph Ponniah	2012	2024
