= Trincomalee Electoral District (1947–1989) =

Electoral district of Sri Lanka

Coordinates: 8.5667°N 81.2333°E

Trincomalee electoral district was an electoral district of Sri Lanka between August 1947 and February 1989. The district was named after the city of Trincomalee in Trincomalee District, Eastern Province. The 1978 Constitution of Sri Lanka introduced the proportional representation electoral system for electing members of Parliament. The existing 160 mainly single-member electoral districts were replaced with 22 multi-member electoral districts. Trincomalee electoral district was replaced by the Trincomalee multi-member electoral district at the 1989 general elections, the first under the PR system, though Trincomalee continues to be a polling division of the multi-member electoral district.

== Members of Parliament ==
Key

Independent ACTC ITAK TULF

Election	Member	Party	Term
1947	S. Sivapalan	All Ceylon Tamil Congress	1947-1952
1952	N. R. Rajavarothiam	Illankai Tamil Arasu Kachchi	1952-1963
1956	N. R. Rajavarothiam	Illankai Tamil Arasu Kachchi	1952-1963
1960 (March)	N. R. Rajavarothiam	Illankai Tamil Arasu Kachchi	1952-1963
1960 (July)	N. R. Rajavarothiam	Illankai Tamil Arasu Kachchi	1952-1963
1963	S. M. Manickarajah	Illankai Tamil Arasu Kachchi	1963-1970
1965	S. M. Manickarajah	Illankai Tamil Arasu Kachchi	1963-1970
1970	B. Neminathan	Illankai Tamil Arasu Kachchi	1970-1977
1977	R. Sampanthan	Tamil United Liberation Front	1977-1989

== Elections ==
=== 1947 Parliamentary General Election ===
Results of the 1st parliamentary election held between 23 August 1947 and 20 September 1947 for the district:

Candidate	Party	Symbol	Votes	%
S. Sivapalan	All Ceylon Tamil Congress	House	5,252	56.15%
A.C. Kanagasingham		Umbrella	3225	34.48%
E.A.P. Nandias Silva		Elephant	877	9.38%
Valid Votes			9,354	100.00%
Rejected Votes			980	
Total Polled			10,334	
Registered Electors			18,421	
Turnout			56.10%	

=== 1952 Parliamentary General Election ===
Results of the 2nd parliamentary election held between 24 May 1952 and 30 May 1952 for the district:

Candidate	Party	Symbol	Votes	%
N. R. Rajavarothiam	Federal Party	House	4,450	45.80%
S. Sivapalan		Elephant	3,864	39.77%
K. Sivapalan		Star	1,403	14.44%
Valid Votes			9,717	100.00%
Rejected Votes			103	
Total Polled			9,820	
Registered Electors			14,272	
Turnout			68.81%	

=== 1956 Parliamentary General Election ===
Results of the 3rd parliamentary election held between 5 April 1956 and 10 April 1956 for the district:

Candidate	Party	Symbol	Votes	%
N. R. Rajavarothiam	Federal Party	House	7,048	56.88%
J.A. Muthuthanthirige		Umbrella	2,965	23.93%
A.I. Rajasingham		Bicycle	2,378	19.19%
Valid Votes			12,391	100.00%
Rejected Votes			58	
Total Polled			12,449	
Registered Electors			16,093	
Turnout			77.36%	

=== 1960 (March) Parliamentary General Election ===
Results of the 4th parliamentary election held on 19 March 1960 for the district:

Candidate	Party	Symbol	Votes	%
N. R. Rajavarothiam	Federal Party	House	8,872	71.43%
R.M.G. Thusthakeer	Independent	Pair of Spectacles	1,311	10.55%
A. Piyadasa		Hand	1,265	10.18%
Sri Lal Goonaratne		Umbrella	973	7.83%
Valid Votes			12,421	100.00%
Rejected Votes			127	
Total Polled			12,548	
Registered Electors			19,024	
Turnout			65.96%	

=== 1960 (July) Parliamentary General Election ===
Results of the 5th parliamentary election held on 20 July 1960 for the district:

Candidate	Party	Symbol	Votes	%
N. R. Rajavarothiam	Federal Party	House	8,649	64.88%
E.R.S.R. Coomaraswamy	Sri Lanka Freedom Party	Hand	4,614	34.61%
K. B.Ariyadasa		Cart Wheel	67	0.50%
Valid Votes			13,330	100.00%
Rejected Votes			116	
Total Polled			13,446	
Registered Electors			19,024	
Turnout			70.68%	

N. R. Rajavarothiam died on 27 August 1963.

=== 1963 Parliamentary By-Election ===
Results of the parliamentary by-election held on November 23, 1963:

Candidate	Party	Symbol	Votes	%
S. M. Manickarajah	Federal Party	House	11,532	60.28%
A. H. Alwis		Star	5,721	29.91%
A. Wijayanathan		Cart Wheel	1,876	9.81%
Valid Votes			19,129	100.00%
Rejected Votes			134	
Total Polled			19,263	
Registered Electors			26,427	
Turnout			72.89%	

=== 1965 Parliamentary General Election ===
Results of the 6th parliamentary election held on 22 March 1965 for the district:

Candidate	Party	Symbol	Votes	%
S. M. Manickarajah	Federal Party	House	9,651	48.48%
V.R. Navaratnarajah		Elephant	5,702	28.64%
S.H. Somapala	Sri Lanka Freedom Party	Hand	4,555	22.88%
Valid Votes			19,908	100.00%
Rejected Votes			271	
Total Polled			20,179	
Registered Electors			27,643	
Turnout			73.00%	

=== 1970 Parliamentary General Election ===
Results of the 7th parliamentary election held on 27 May 1970 for the district:

Candidate	Party	Symbol	Votes	%
B. Neminathan	Federal Party	House	12,395	45.83%
S.M.A. C. Jamaldeen	United Front	Hand	8,346	30.86%
V.R. Navaratnarajah		Elephant	5,703	21.09%
R.G.Senanayake		Bell	601	2.22%
Valid Votes			27,045	100.00%
Rejected Votes			108	
Total Polled			27,153	
Registered Electors			35,445	
Turnout			76.61%	

=== 1977 Parliamentary General Election ===
Results of the 8th parliamentary election held on 21 July 1977 for the district:

Candidate	Party	Symbol	Votes	%
R. Sampanthan	Tamil United Liberation Front	Sun	15,144	51.76%
V.R. Navaratnarajah		Elephant	11,823	40.41%
S. Thavarasa	Sri Lanka Freedom Party	Hand	1,674	5.72%
Gunadasa Warnasuriya		Butterfly	565	1.93%
E.J.A.P. Babysingho		Bell	54	0.18%
Valid Votes			29,260	100.00%
Rejected Votes			119	
Total Polled			29,379	
Registered Electors			35,778	
Turnout			82.11%	
