= Vidattaltivu =

Vidataltivu விடத்தல்தீவு විධත්තල්තීවූ
- Town
- Location within Northern Province
- Coordinates: 9°00′54″N 80°03′00″E
- Country: Sri Lanka
- Province: Northern
- District: Mannar
- DS Division: Manthai West
- Time zone: UTC+5:30 (Sri Lanka Standard Time Zone)
  - Summer (DST): UTC+6 (Summer time)

Vidataltivu (Tamil: விடத்தல் தீவு, Sinhala: විධත්තල්තීවූ) is a coastal town in the Mannar District of northern Sri Lanka. It was used as the base to control the Mannar coast by the sea tigers of LTTE. Vidataltivu is the largest town on Sri Lanka's northern coast and was the major base of the Sea Tigers. The Sri Lankan military claimed to have captured this coastal town for the first time since the IPKF left Sri Lanka in 1990.

== Schools ==
- Thuya Joseph Vaz Maha Vidyalayam
- Mn/Aligarh Maha Vidyalayam

== Religious places of worship ==
=== Catholic churches ===
- St. James' church, Vidataltivu
- St. Mary's church Vidataltivu

=== Hindu temple ===
- Pillaiyar temple

=== Mosque ===
- Vidattaltivu Jumma Mosque(Grand Mosque)
- Vidattaltivu Thaqiya Mosque

== Sport clubs ==
- United sports club- vidathaltivu

== See also ==
- Battle of the Forward Defence Lines
