= Puliyanthivu =

Native name: புளியந்தீவு පුළියංතීවු
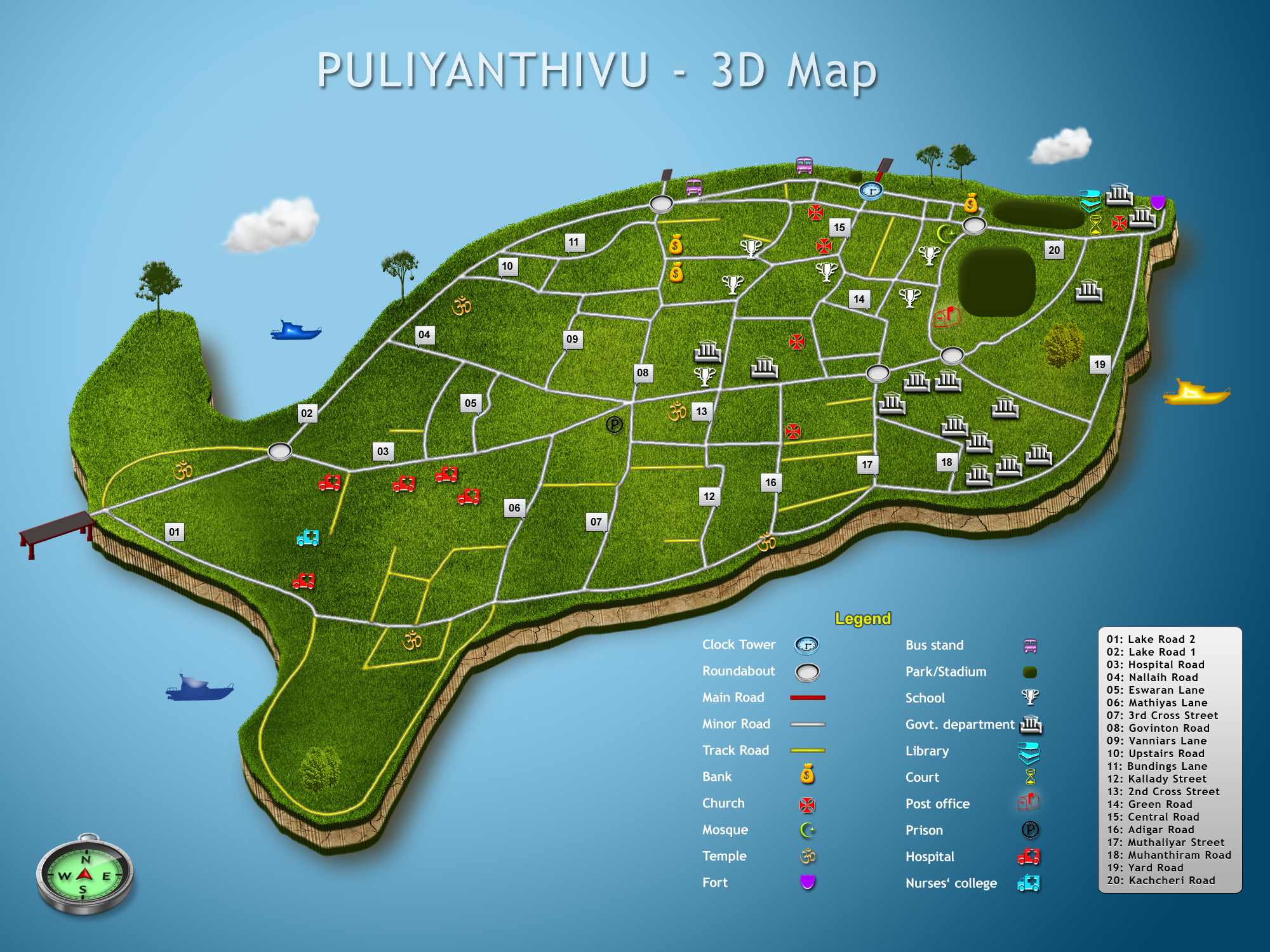
- Puliyanthivu in 3D map
- Interactive map of Puliyanthivu

Geography
- Location: Batticaloa Lagoon

Administration
- Sri Lanka
- District: Batticaloa District
- City: Batticaloa

Demographics
- Population: 7,034

Puliyanthivu (Tamil: புளியந்தீவு) is an island of Sri Lanka and the location of the oldest part of Batticaloa town. It is home to government buildings, schools, houses of worship and places of historical importance, notably Batticaloa Fort. It is connected to the rest of the city by three bridges, including the Old Kallady Bridge from 1924, the oldest iron bridge in the country.

== Etymology ==
The historical book Mattakalapputh Thamilakam quotes Swami Vipulananda that Vedda’s chieftain Puliyan ruled the area and his name later adapted to the island. Puliyanthivu literally means "island of Puliyan" (thivu means island in Tamil). Also, the book quotes from Mahavamsa that there was a caste called Pulinthar, which could be the reason for the name of the island. As villages in the area are commonly named after a tree or a body of water, the island could have been named after the tamarind trees which grew in the area. Tamarind is called puli in Tamil. Literally, it means "island of tamarind".

== History ==
In the 11th century, there were seven ministers of king Kathirsuthan of the Chola dynasty which ruled the area, one of whom was named Pulimaran.

On the site of Batticaloa fort, the remains of a 1st century BCE Buddhist stupa and shatra from the Ruhuna Kingdom were found. The fort itself was built by the Portuguese in 1628, and conquered by the Dutch in 1638, finally being taken over by the British in 1795.

Under British colonial rule, many government buildings were constructed on the island, including the Kachcheri (district secretariat). Schools built during this period have become the most prestigious schools in Batticaloa, such as St Michael's College, St Vincent's College, St Cecilia’s Girls' College, and Central College. The main stadium is named after Jesuit priest, Rev Weber of St Michael’s College.
