= Diocese of Trincomalee =

Latin Catholic diocese in Sri Lanka

Coordinates: 8.5681°N 81.2370°E

Diocese of Trincomalee Dioecesis Trincomaliensis திருகோணமலை மட்டக்களப்பு மறைமாவட்டத்தின்

Location
- Country: Sri Lanka
- Ecclesiastical province: Colombo
- Metropolitan: Colombo

Statistics
- Area: 8,397 km^{2} (3,242 sq mi)
- Population: Total; Catholics: (as of 2010); 1,607,865; 78,518 (4.9%)

Information
- Denomination: Catholic Church
- Sui iuris church: Latin Church
- Rite: Roman Rite
- Established: 25 August 1893
- Cathedral: St. Mary’s Cathedral, Trincomalee

Current leadership
- Pope: Leo XIV
- Bishop: Noel Emmanuel
- Metropolitan Archbishop: Malcolm Ranjith
- Bishops emeritus: Kingsley Swampillai

The Diocese of Trincomalee (Latin: Dioecesis Trincomaliensis) is a Latin Catholic diocese for eastern Sri Lanka. The current bishop is Noel Emmanuel.

== History ==
The Diocese of Trincomalee was created on 25 August 1893 from parts of the Archdiocese of Colombo and the Diocese of Jaffna. In the Eastern Province of Sri Lanka there were two abandon regions.According to the report of Rev.FR Etinne Sameria ( omi), in 1850, in Trincomalee there were five churches with 1,500 Catholics. Every Sunday sermon was delivered in English and Tamil.

The diocese was renamed Diocese of Trincomalee–Batticaloa on 23 October 1967. On 19 December 1975 parts of the diocese were transferred to newly created Apostolic Prefecture of Anuradhapura. The diocese was renamed Diocese of Trincomalee on 3 July 2012 after parts of the diocese were transferred to newly created Diocese of Batticaloa.

== Bishops ==
#	Bishop	Took office	Left office
1st	Charles Lavigne	1898	1913
2nd	Gaston Robichez	1917	1946
3rd	Ignatius Philip Trigueros Glennie	1947	1974
4th	Leo Rajendram Antony	1974	1983
5th	Kingsley Swampillai	1983	2015
6th	Noel Emmanuel	2015	
