= Roman Catholic Diocese of Suacia =

Roman Catholic titular see in Montenegro

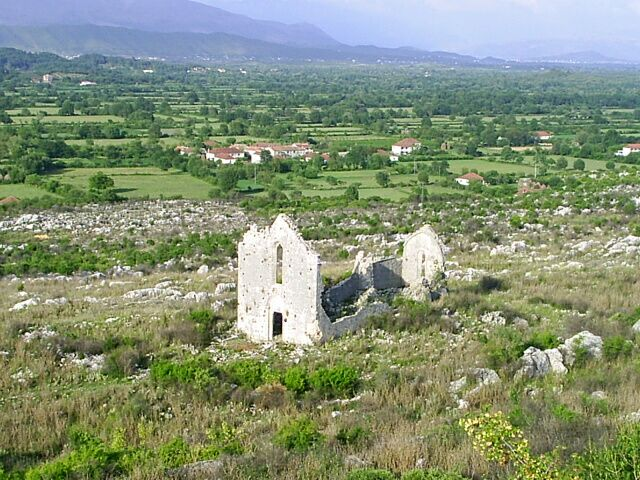
Medieval ruins of the town of Svač, Montenegro

The Roman Catholic Diocese of Suacia (Latin: Dioecesis Suacinensis, Albanian: Dioqeza e Shasit, Serbian: Svačka biskupija) was a bishopric with see in the town of Svač (Latinized as Suacia), which is today the village lying to the east of Ulcinj in Montenegro that is called in Serbian Шас, in Croat Šas and in Albanian Shas.

== History ==
The area was part of the late Roman province of Dalmatia Superior, and the Catholic Church, which includes the diocese in its list of Latin titular sees, accordingly treats it as a suffragan of the Metropolitan Archdiocese of Doclea.

The diocese of Svač (Suacia in Italian, Šas in Croatian, Suacium in Latin) was established circa 1000.

The see of the Diocese of Svač was suppressed in 1530, when its canonical territory was incorporated into that of the Albanian then Diocese of Shkodrë, now the Metropolitan Archdiocese of Shkodër-Pult.

== Episcopal ordinaries ==
(all Roman Rite; probably incomplete, notably much of the first centuries)

Suffragan (?) Bishops of Svač

- Basilio (1141? – 1150?)
- Pietro (1166.06 – ?)
- Dominio (1190? – 1199.09)
- G. (1200–?)
- ? Mark (ca. 1262)
- ? Peter (ca. 1284)
- Gregorio (1303?–1307)
- Benedetto (1307.12.24 – 1317.07.08), later Metropolitan Archbishop of Ragusa (Croatia) (1317.07.08 – death 1317)
- Zaccaria, Dominican Order O.P.) (1318.07.13 – ?)
- Sergio (? – death 1345?)
- Paolo, Carmelite Order (O. Carm.) (1345–?)
- Pietro (1363?–?)
- Minore (? – 1403.09.13), later Archbishop of Durrës (Durazzo, Albania) (1403.09.13 – ?)
- Petrus Kirten (1404.02.27 – ?)
- Antonio da Firenze, Dominican Order (O.P.) (1418.08.12 – ?)
- Pietro (1420 – 1435.05.14), later Bishop of Ulcinj (Dulcigno, Montenegro) (1435.05.14 – death 1441?)
- Sergio (1439.05.18 – ?death ?1440)
- Paolo Dusso (1440.11.16 – 1445.12.22), later Bishop of Drivasto (Albania) (1445.12.22 – 1455)
- Antonio da Fabriano, Friars Minor O.F.M.) (1446.07.18 – 1465.04.20), later Bishop of Caorle (northeastern Italy) (1465.04.20 – death 1469)
- Francesco (? – death 1507?)
- Stefano (1507.02.07 – ?)
- Nicola (1517.04.08 – ?)
- Giovanni Rosa (1520.01.27 – 1524.10.12), later Bishop of Skradin (Croatia) (1524.10.12 – 1531.04.23), then Bishop of Krk (Croatia) (1531.04.23 – 1549) while remaining Apostolic Administrator of above Skradin (1531.04.23 – 1549)
- Tommaso (1530.07.13 – ?)

=== Titular see ===
The diocese was nominally restored in 1933 as titular bishopric of Suacia.

It has had the following incumbents, of the fitting episcopal (lowest) rank:

- Denis J. Moynihan (17 July 1969 – 10 December 1970), on emeritate, formerly Bishop of Ross (Ireland) (1941.07.05 – 1952.02.10) and Bishop of Kerry (Ireland) (1952.02.10 – 1969.07.17); died 1975
- Charles Roman Koester (2 January 1971 – death 24 December 1997), as Auxiliary Bishop of Saint Louis (USA) (1971.01.02 – 1991.09.10) and on emeritate
- Richard Edmund Pates (22 December 2000 – 10 April 2008), as Auxiliary Bishop of Saint Paul and Minneapolis (USA) (2000.12.22 – 2008.04.10); later Bishop of Des Moines (USA) (2008.04.10 – ...)
- Bernardito Cleopas Auza (8 May 2008 – ...), as papal diplomat: Apostolic Nuncio (ambassador) to Haiti (2008.05.08 – 2014.07.01), Permanent Observer to the United Nations (UN) (2014.07.01 – ...) and Permanent Observer to the Organization of American States (OAS) (2014.07.16 – ...)

== See also ==
- List of Catholic dioceses in Montenegro

== Sources and external links ==
- GCatholic with Google satellite photo
