= Holy See–Indonesia relations =

- Holy See: Indonesia

The Holy See and Indonesia established diplomatic relations on 13 March 1950. Relations are important as part of global interfaith dialogue, because Indonesia has the world's largest Muslim-majority population. Indonesia recognizes Roman Catholicism as one of its six approved religions. The Holy See has a nunciature in Jakarta, while Indonesia has an embassy in Rome.

== History ==
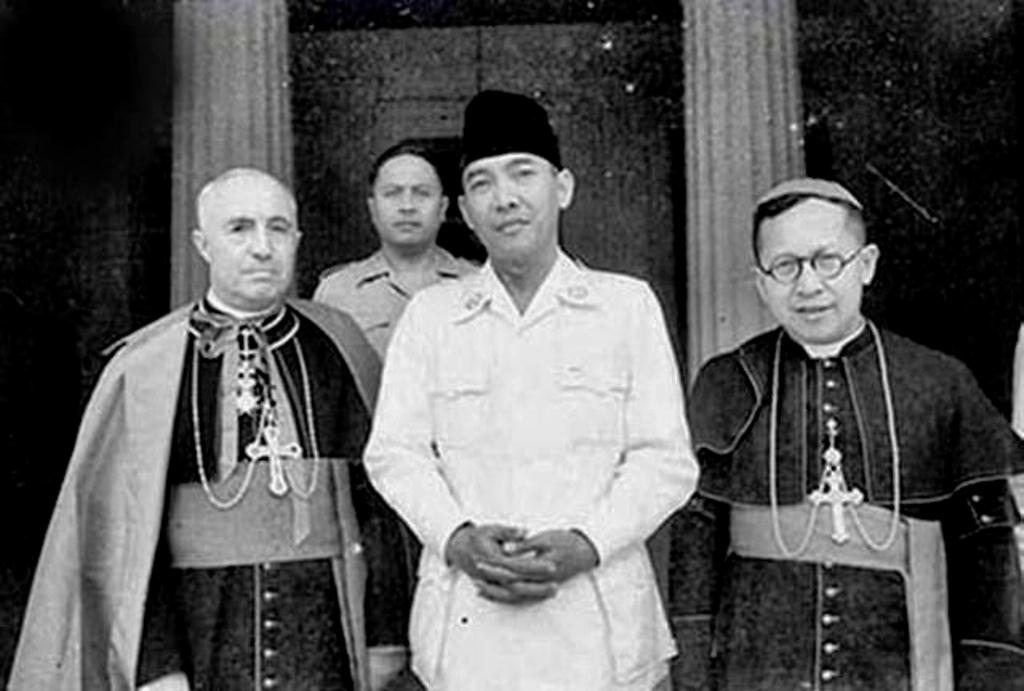
Georges-Marie de Jonghe d'Ardoye (left) with first Indonesian President Sukarno and Jesuit bishop Albertus Soegijapranata, c. 1947.

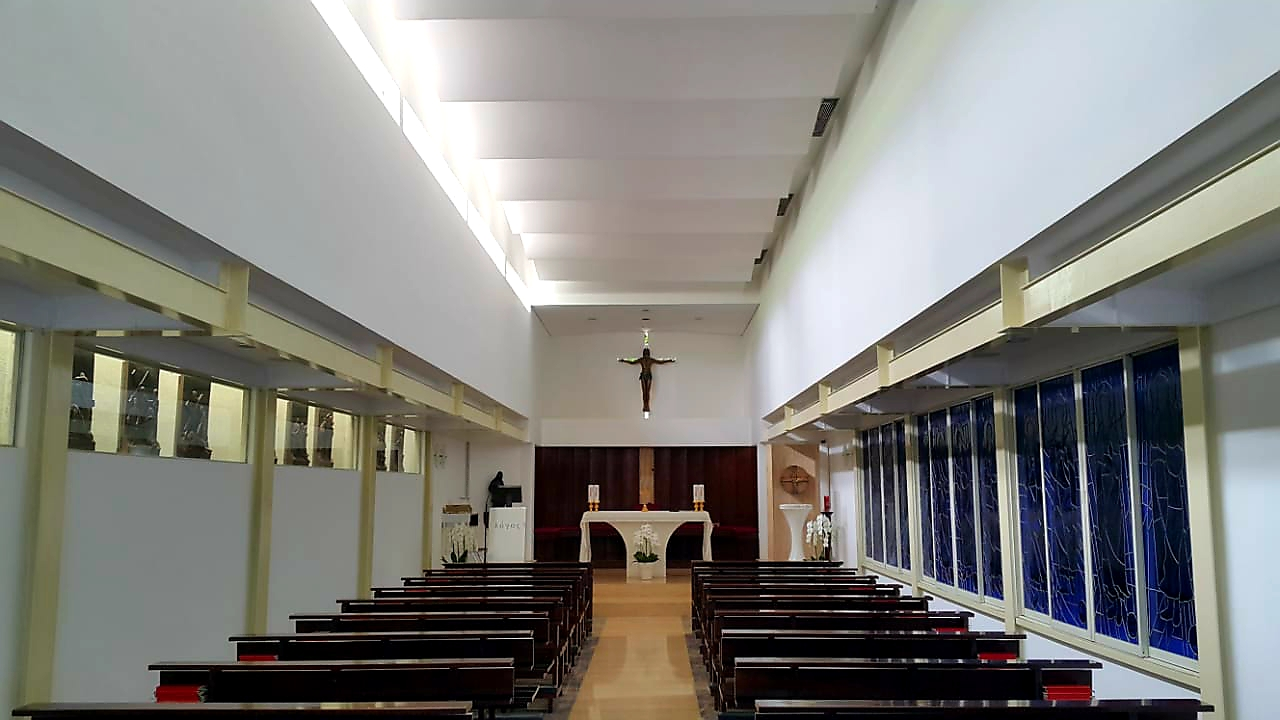
Chapel of the Vatican Embassy in Jakarta

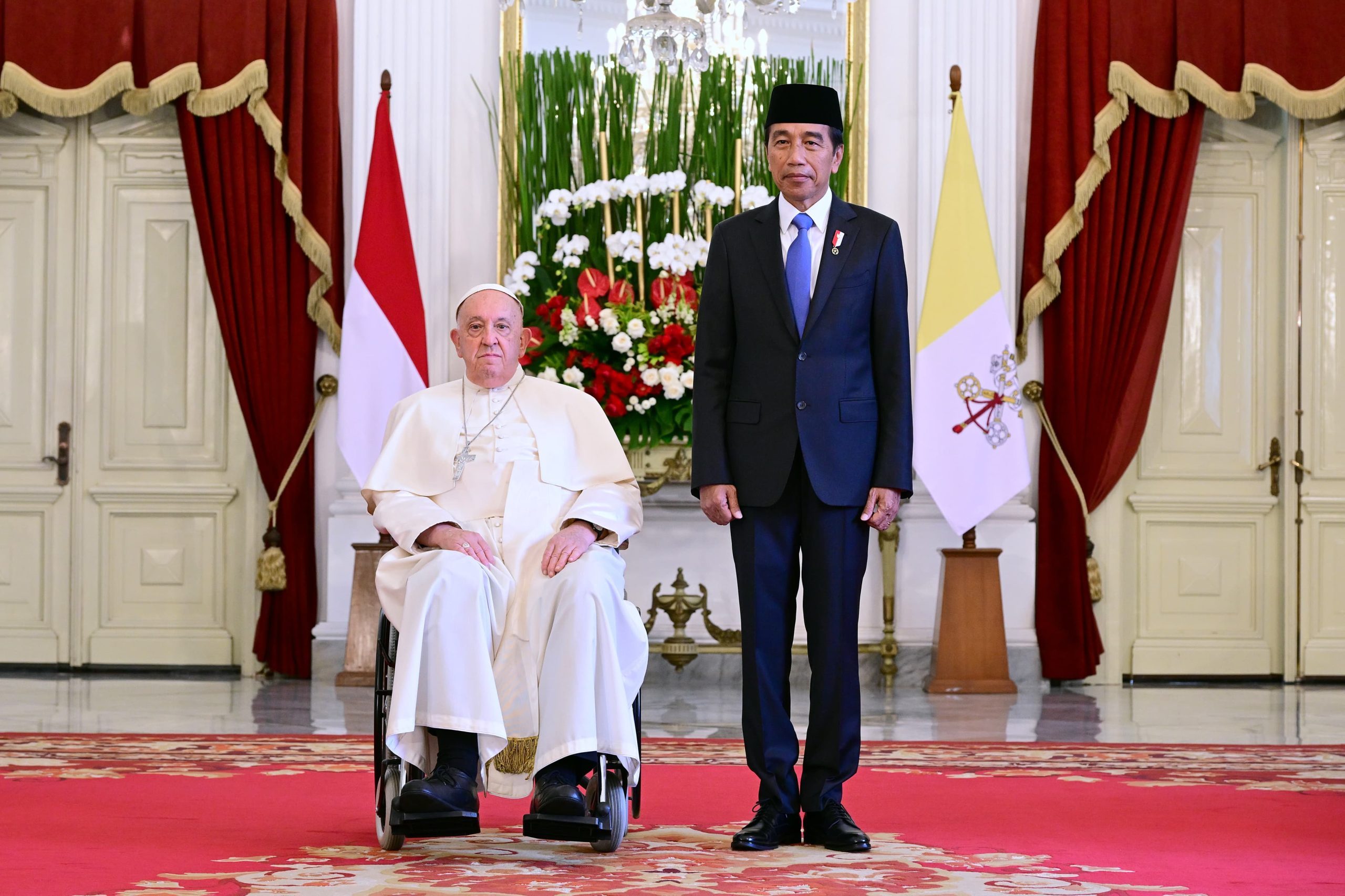
President Joko Widodo and Pope Francis at the Merdeka Palace

There have been relations between the Holy See and Indonesia since the era of the Majapahit empire. Between 1318 and 1330 CE, Mattiussi, a Franciscan friar, visited several places in today's Indonesia: Sumatra, Java, and Borneo. He was sent by the Pope to launch a mission into the lands of Mongols in the Asian interior. In his report, he described the marvelous palace of the Javanese King and the war with the Great Khan of China. It was the court of Majapahit king Jayanegara in Trowulan that was visited by Mattiussi.

During the colonial era of the Dutch East Indies, some parts of Indonesia, such as Flores, were known as Catholic-majority areas. During colonial times, most Dutch people residing in the Dutch East Indies were Dutch Reformed Protestants; however, the teachings of the Catholic Church began to spread there in the 19th century. The Vatican only recognized Indonesia on July 6, 1947 which was marked by the opening of an embassy called the Apostolic Nunciature to Indonesia and assigning Georges-Marie de Jonghe d'Ardoye as the first Vatican ambassador in Jakarta for the period 1947-1955.

== State visits ==
There have been three papal visits to Indonesia: those of Pope Paul VI in December 1970, Pope John Paul II in October 1989, and Pope Francis in September 2024. All of them paid a courtesy visit to Indonesian President, with both Pope Paul VI and Pope John Paul II to President Suharto, and Pope Francis to President Joko Widodo. During his visit, Pope John Paul II celebrated a Mass and addressed a crowd of 130,000 Indonesian Catholics congregated in Gelora Bung Karno Stadium. Since September 2017, the Apostolic Nunciature to Indonesia has been assigned to Archbishop Piero Pioppo.

Pope Leo XIV or Robert Prevost, prior of the Order of Saint Augustine back then, visited to Indonesia in 2003, with the agenda of celebrating the anniversary of the service of the Order of Saint Augustine in Papua.

== See also ==
- Catholicism in Indonesia
- Christianity in Indonesia
- Pope Francis' visit to Indonesia
- Foreign relations of Indonesia
