= Gianoli =

Gianoli is an Italian surname. Notable people with the surname include:

- Clotilde Bressler-Gianoli (1875–1912), Swiss-Italian opera singer
- Reine Gianoli (1915–1979), French classical pianist
- Martín Gianoli (born 2000), Uruguayan footballer

== See also ==
- Gianola
- Xavier Giannoli (born 1972), French film director
