= Basilica of Our Lady of Lanka =

Roman Catholic basilica in Tewatte, Sri Lanka

- Ragama Basilica/Tewatte Basilica
- Sinhala: ලංකා අප ස්වාමිදුවගේ බැසිලිකාව
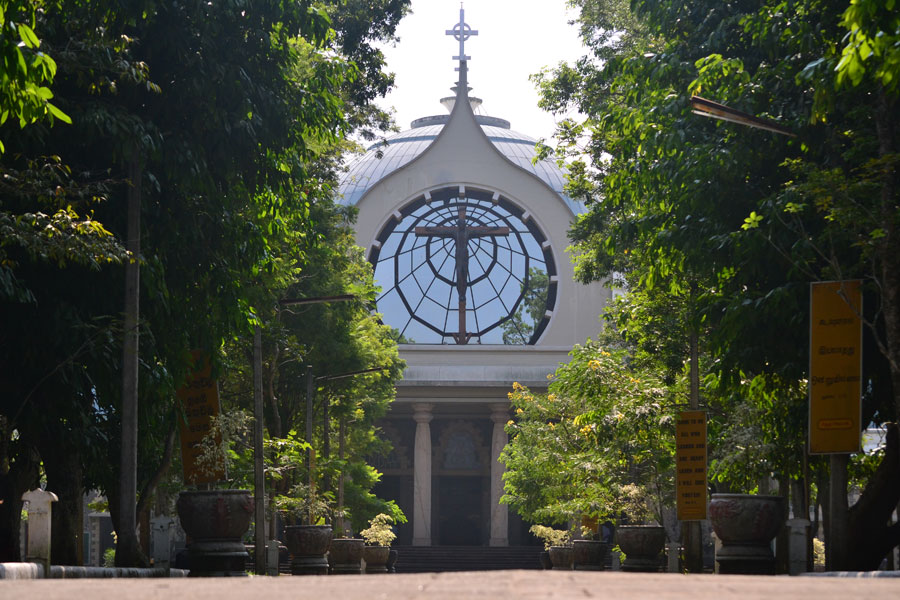
- Front view of the basilica

- Location in Sri Lanka
- 7.033593°N 79.935089°E
- Location: Tewatte, Ragama, Sri Lanka
- Country: Sri Lanka
- Language(s): Sinhala; Tamil; English; Latin
- Denomination: Roman Catholic

History
- Status: Minor Basilica; National shrine
- Founded: February 6, 1974; 52 years ago
- Founder: Jean-Marie Masson
- Dedication: Our Lady of Lanka(Mary Immaculate)

Architecture
- Functional status: Active
- Architect: Spanish architect Fr. Heras
- Groundbreaking: February 4, 1950; 76 years ago
- Completed: February 6, 1974; 52 years ago

Administration
- District: Gampaha District
- Province: Western Province
- Archdiocese: Archdiocese of Colombo

Clergy
- Archbishop: Malcolm Ranjith

Basilica of Our Lady of Lanka
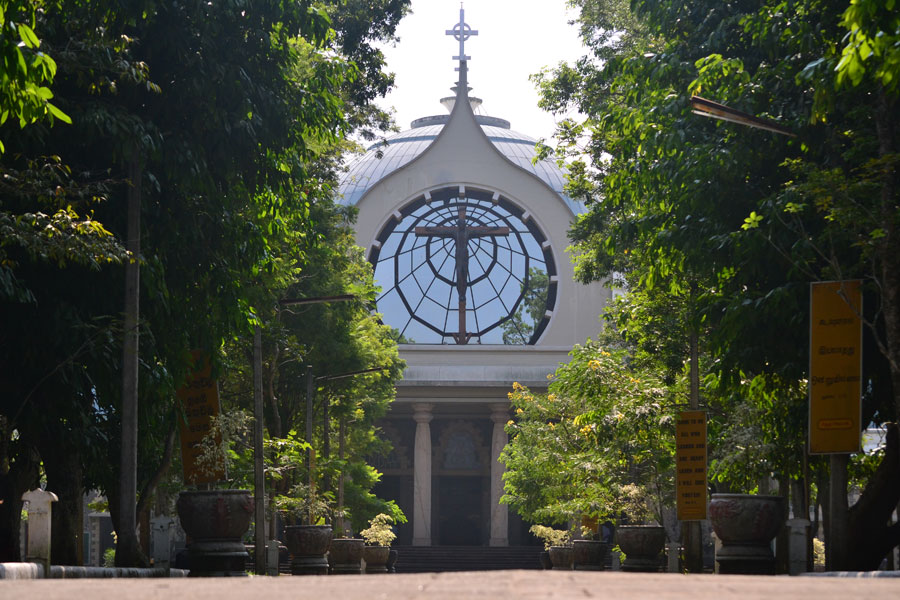

Religion
- Feast day: 4 February (same day the Independence of Sri Lanka is celebrated)

Location
- Interactive map of Basilica of Our Lady of Lanka

Specifications
- Direction of façade: North East
- Length: 319 feet (97 m)
- Interior area: 2,758.8 m^{2} (29,696 sq ft)
- Height (max): 125 feet (38 m)
- Site area: 25 ha (62 acres)

The Basilica of Our Lady of Lanka (Sinhala: ලංකා අප ස්වාමිදුවගේ බැසිලිකාව, romanized: Laṁkā Apa Svāmiduvagē Bæsilikāva; Tamil: லங்கா மாதா பேராலயம், romanized: Laṅkā Mātā Pērālayam) is a Roman Catholic basilica in Tewatte, Sri Lanka. Being thus in a somewhat distant suburb of Colombo, it comes under the purview of the Roman Catholic Archdiocese of Colombo and is a site of pilgrimage for Sri Lankan Catholics. The church is home to the venerated statue of Our Lady of Lanka.

== History ==
Our Lady of Lanka started its life in 1911 as a small chapel dedicated to Our Lady of Lourdes (Mary Immaculate), France. It was built by a local priest, Fr. A. Kieger and a few Catholic laymen, as a part of the parish of Ragama at that time. In 1917 another priest, Fr. A. Collorec had a grotto built for Our Lady of Lourdes, with the assistance of Catholic workers from Colombo. The growing popularity of the chapel led to the chapel being expanded into a church in the 1930s.

However, its true rise to fame occurred due to the former Archbishop of Colombo, Jean-Marie Masson. During the outbreak of the Second World War, Archbishop Masson made a vow that if Ceylon were to be protected from major conflict, he would build a Votive Basilica under the title Our Lady of Lanka. Ceylon was indeed spared from any major warfare. The archbishop was delighted and in 1946 he obtained approval from the then Pope, Pius XII, for the construction of a basilica in honour of Our Lady of Lanka.

Masson died the following year and his successor Archbishop Thomas Cooray took on the responsibility of ensuring his predecessor's vision was realized; In 1948 Pope Pius XII established the Mary Immaculate, to be known as Our Lady of Lanka, as the principal Roman Catholic patroness of the island. He then acquired a nearby rubber estate and had the basilica constructed on the amply-sized land. Many shady local trees such as Neem and Na were planted to give a place for future pilgrims to rest under.

On February 4, 1950, the cornerstone for the basilica was laid. It was completed in 1974, a year after Pope Paul VI endowed the church with the title of Minor Basilica. On February 6, 1974, the consecration of the basilica and crowning of the statue of Our Lady of Lanka took place; making it the national basilica and a national shrine of Sri Lanka.

== Architecture ==
The Basilica of Our Lady of Lanka, designed by Fr. Heras, incorporates Asian architectural elements appreciated by Buddhist and Hindu devotees. The front porch has six pillars representing the dioceses during WWII which were Colombo, Galle, Jaffna, Kandy, Chilaw and Trincomalee; and a cross with a bronze Christ figure by Sri Lankan artist Leila Peiris, set against a circular glass in a spider web design, within a stupa-inspired frame. The statue was made with a resemblance of Christ's face on the shroud of Turin, as per the insistence of the Cardinal.

Twin towers with golden bell enclosures reflect Hindu gopuram designs. The cruciform structure features a central dome with a cross of the Eastern Oriental Church, granite walls, and wooden doorways with Indian architraves. Inside, a life-sized statue of Our Lady of Lanka carved by Thedim holds the infant Jesus with a golden rosary. The altar is made of undressed white stone, with railings of various local woods. The Holy of Holies has a replica of the Ark of the Covenant, and an ivory cross hangs above. The cross is a historical 17th Century cross from Puttlam. The crypt houses the Blessed Sacrament Chapel and Cardinal Cooray’s tomb.

The outside of the Basilica has plenty to see as well. These include the four convents, the Museum and Jubilee Hall, the Retreat House, the new and old grottos of Our Lady of Lourdes, the bathing pond and lake, the old church etc. The right end of the basilica gives a panoramic views of Adam's Peak early in the morning. The grotto was made to resemble Lourdes and the Kandyan-style museum contains religious artifacts and Cardinal Cooray's vestments.
