= Vincenzo Maria Farano =

Italian prelate

- Archbishop of Gaeta
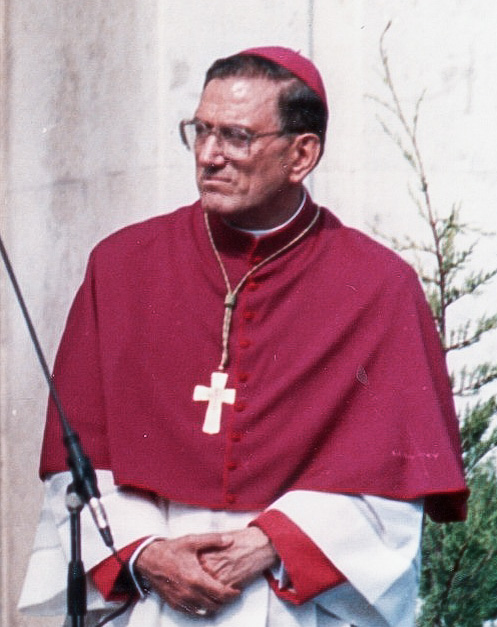
- Church: Catholic Church
- Archdiocese: Archdiocese of Gaeta
- In office: 14 August 1986 – 12 February 1997
- Predecessor: Luigi Maria Carli
- Successor: Pier Luigi Mazzoni
- Previous posts: Apostolic Nuncio to Ecuador (1979-1986); Titular Archbishop of Cluentum (1973-1986); Apostolic Pro-Nuncio to Indonesia (1973-1979)

Orders
- Ordination: 3 June 1944
- Consecration: 30 September 1973 by Jean-Marie Villot

Personal details
- Born: 21 July 1921 Trani, Province of Bari, Kingdom of Italy
- Died: 17 January 2008 (aged 86) Gianola, Formia, Province of Latina, Italy

Vincenzo Maria Farano (21 July 1921 – 17 January 2008) was an Italian prelate of the Catholic Church who worked in the diplomatic service of the Holy See and served as an Apostolic Nuncio to Indonesia and Ecuador before spending more than a decade as Archbishop of Gaeta.

== Biography ==
Vincenzo Maria Farano was born on 21 July 1921 in Trani, Italy. He was ordained a priest on 3 June 1944.

To prepare for a diplomatic career he entered the Pontifical Ecclesiastical Academy in 1952.

On 8 August 1973, Pope Paul VI appointed him titular archbishop of Cluentum and Apostolic Pro-Nuncio to Indonesia. He received his episcopal consecration on 30 September 1973 from Cardinal Jean-Marie Villot.

On 25 August 1979, Pope John Paul II named him Apostolic Nuncio to Ecuador.

On 14 August 1986, Pope John Paul named him Archbishop of Gaeta.

Pope John Paul accepted his resignation on 12 February 1997.

He died at his home in Gianola on 17 January 2008 shortly after being released from the hospital.
