= Lelio Orsi =

Italian painter (1508/1511–1587)

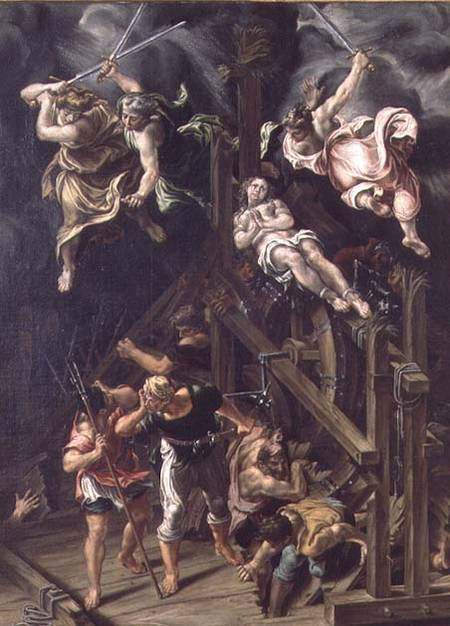
The Martyrdom of Saint Catherine, Galleria Estense, Modena, 1560.

Lelio Orsi (1508/1511 – 1587), also known as Lelio da Novellara, was a Mannerist painter and architect of the Reggio Emilia school in northern Italy.

He was born and died in Novellara, and much of his work was completed in Reggio. He appears to have studied under such as Giovanni Giarola, a pupil of Antonio da Correggio. There is documentary evidence that he visited Rome in 1554–55, and may have been influenced by Girolamo Bedoli, Correggio and the prototypic mannerists Giulio Romano as well as Michelangelo and his successor Daniele da Volterra. He is said to have trained Raffaellino da Reggio. Other pupils or followers were Giovanni Bianchi, known as il Bertone Reggiano, and Jacopo Borbone of Novellara. He was active in both exterior and interior decoration, and much of his work is in small cabinet pieces, not large altarpieces. Much of his output ended in the collections of the Dukes of Este in Ferrara.

Orsi’s style draws upon the ethereal simplicity of Correggio, but also incorporates the contorted poses, perspective distortions, and crowded settings characteristic of Mannerism. At times, the cumulative effect is unsettling. While the angels above unsheathing divine swords are meant to carry the day in The Martyrdom of Saint Catherine it appears that the execution was stymied by breakdown within the complex set of depicted gears.

== Selected attributions ==
- The Martyrdom of Saint Catherine (1560) - Galleria Estense, Modena
- The Dead Christ Flanked by Charity and Justice
- Madonna della Ghiara (1569)
- Saints Cecilia & Valerian - Galleria Borghese, Rome
- Noli Me Tangere - Wadsworth Atheneum, Hartford
- The Adoration of the Shepherds (1565–70) - Gemäldegalerie, Berlin
- The Walk to Emmaus (1565) - National Gallery, London
- St. George and the Dragon (1550) - Museo di Capodimonte, Naples
- St Michael subduing Satan and weighing the Souls of the Dead (1540s) - Ashmolean Museum, Oxford
- Christ in the Garden of Gethsemane (1545) - Strossmayer Gallery, Zagreb

== Sources ==
- Freedberg, Sydney J. (1993). Painting in Italy, 1500-1600. Penguin Books. pp. 577–679.
- Smyth, Francis P. (1986). John P. O'Neill (ed.). The Age of Correggio and the Carracci: Emilian Painting of the 16th and 17th Centuries. Washington DC: National Gallery of Art. pp. 150–158.
- Eitel-Porter, Rhoda (2017). Lelio Orsi, Antonio Pérez and The Minotaur Before a Broken Labyrinth. Vol. XXXIV. Print Quarterly. pp. 11–19. https://www.academia.edu/35805991/_Lelio_Orsi_Antonio_P%C3%A9rez_and_The_Minotaur_Before_a_Broken_Labyrinth_
