= List of Catholic dioceses in Montenegro =

The (Roman) Catholic Church in Montenegro only comprises two Latin dioceses, one of which is an exempt archdiocese, which has no ecclesiastical province.

It has no national episcopal conference, but its episcopate participates in the International Episcopal Conference of Saints Cyril and Methodius, jointly with fellow former-Yugoslavian Balkan countries Kosovo, Macedonia and Serbia (not Croatia or Slovenia, which have a national conference each).

There is no Eastern Catholic or pre-diocesan jurisdiction.

There is also an Apostolic Nunciature to Montenegro as papal diplomatic representation (embassy level), which is however vested in the Apostolic Nunciature to Bosnia and Herzegovina (in its capital Sarajevo).

== Current Latin dioceses ==
- Archdiocese of Bar, now non-Metropolitan and Exempt, i.e. immediately subject to the Holy See
- Diocese of Kotor, suffragan of the Croatian Metropolitan Archdiocese of Split–Makarska

== Titular sees ==
All six defunct dioceses in Montenegro have been nominally restored as Latin Titular sees :

A Metropolitan Titular archbishopric

- Doclea

Five Titular bishoprics

- Budua
- (Herceg) Novi
- Risinium (Risinio)
- Suacia (Svač)
- Ulcinj (Dulcigno, Ulcinium).

== See also ==
- List of Catholic dioceses (structured view)
- Catholic Church in Montenegro#History
- Catholic Church in Montenegro#Organisation

== Sources and external links ==
- GCatholic
