= Batriana =

Town in Roman North Africa

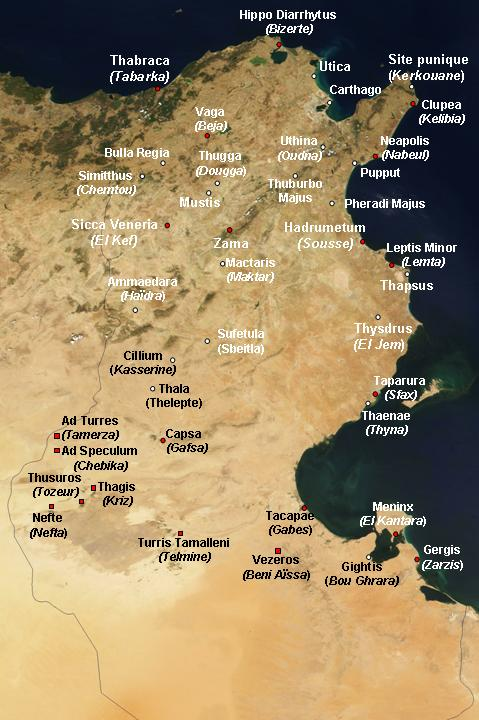
Map showing Turres

Batriana was a civitas (town) of Roman North Africa. The location of the town remains unknown but it was somewhere south of Tunis (Carthage).

The town was also the seat of a Roman era Christian bishopric, which although ceasing to function with the Muslim conquest of the Maghreb, survives today as a titular see of the Roman Catholic Church, and the current bishop is Renzo Fratini of Andorra.
