= Oswald Gomis =

Catholic archbishop (1932–2023)

The Most Reverend Dr. Oswald Gomis
- Archbishop Emeritus of Colombo
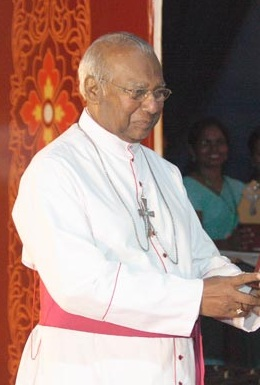
- See: Colombo
- Installed: 6 July 2002
- Term ended: 16 June 2009
- Predecessor: Nicholas Fernando
- Successor: Malcolm Ranjith
- Other posts: Auxiliary Bishop of Colombo and Titular Bishop of Mulia (1968–1995); Bishop of Anuradhapura (1995–2002)

Orders
- Ordination: 3 February 1958 by Thomas Benjamin Cooray
- Consecration: 9 April 1968 by Thomas Benjamin Cooray

Personal details
- Born: 12 December 1932 Kelaniya, Gampaha District, British Ceylon
- Died: 3 February 2023 (aged 90)
- Denomination: Roman Catholic Church

Oswald Thomas Colman Gomis (Sinhala: ඔස්වල්ඩ් තෝමස් කොල්මන් ගෝමිස්; 12 December 1932 – 3 February 2023) was the emeritus Roman Catholic Archbishop of Colombo and the former Chancellor of the University of Colombo (2002–2021). Msgr. Gomis' previous post was as the Bishop of Anuradhapura having been appointed in 1996. He was also the Auxiliary Bishop of Colombo from 1968 to 1996. He formally relinquished office and retired on 5 August 2009.

== Early life ==
Born on 12 December 1932 in the city of Kelaniya, Gampaha district, Sri Lanka, Gomis attended St. Joseph's College and St. Benedict's College, Colombo and then entered the seminary in 1950. He was ordained priest on 3 February 1958. He was consecrated bishop on 17 July 1968. He has held several posts during his service in the Archdiocese, such as, Lecturer at St. Aloysius' Seminary, Colombo from 1958 to 1960, and Director cum Editor of the Catholic Press, Colombo from 1961 to 1968.

== Social work ==
Styles of Oswald Gomis
- Reference style: The Most Reverend
- Spoken style: Your Grace
- Religious style: Archbishop
- Posthumous style: none

In order to assist children from villages outside Colombo he has been instrumental in founding various branch schools in the outer districts affiliated with the main colleges in Colombo. He has been involved in various aid schemes for the poor; construction of houses for tsunami victims, relief and rehabilitation work, and a scholarship programme for children affected by the tsunami in 2004. He has also donated a health centre to his hometown of Kelaniya.

Branch schools founded

- St. Peter's College, Gampaha
- St. Peter's College, Udugampola
- Holy Cross College, Payagala
- St. Joseph's College, Wattala
- St. Joseph's College, Kadolkele
- Loyola College, Bopitiya
- Christ the King College, Weliweriya

== Archbishop ==
On 6 July 2002, he was appointed Metropolitan Archbishop of Colombo by Pope John Paul II. He was installed as the Archbishop on 27 July 2002. Following his earlier appointment as the Secretary General of the Asian Bishops' Conferences, he was reappointed in the same year. He was also appointed by Pope Benedict XVI as a Synodal Father on 8 September 2005, and has met with him on 2 May 2007 to discuss the civil war situation in Sri Lanka. He is also the 3rd Archbishop of Colombo that is Sri Lankan, as following the erection of the Diocese by Pope Gregory XVI on 3 December 1834, all Archbishops until 1947 had been of foreign heritage. He retired on 5 August 2009.

== Death ==
Gomis died on 3 February 2023, at the age of 90.

Catholic Church titles
Preceded by Nicholas Fernando	Archbishop of Colombo; 2002–2009	Succeeded by Malcolm Ranjith
Preceded by —	Auxiliary Bishop of Colombo; 1968–1995	Succeeded by —
Preceded by Waldyr Calheiros Novaes	Titular Bishop of Mulia; 1968–1995	Succeeded by John Raymond Manz
