= Doracium =

Doracium (Greek: Δωρακίον), was an ancient town of Illyricum, which Hierocles calls the metropolis of the Provincia Praevalitana – a title which rightly belongs to Scodra. Wesseling has supposed that it might represent Dioclea, but this is not confirmed. Its precise location is not known.
