= Bernardito Auza =

Filipino Catholic prelate (born 1959)

The Most Reverend Bernardito Cleopas Auza O.P., D.D.
- Apostolic Nuncio to the European Union; Titular Archbishop of Suacia
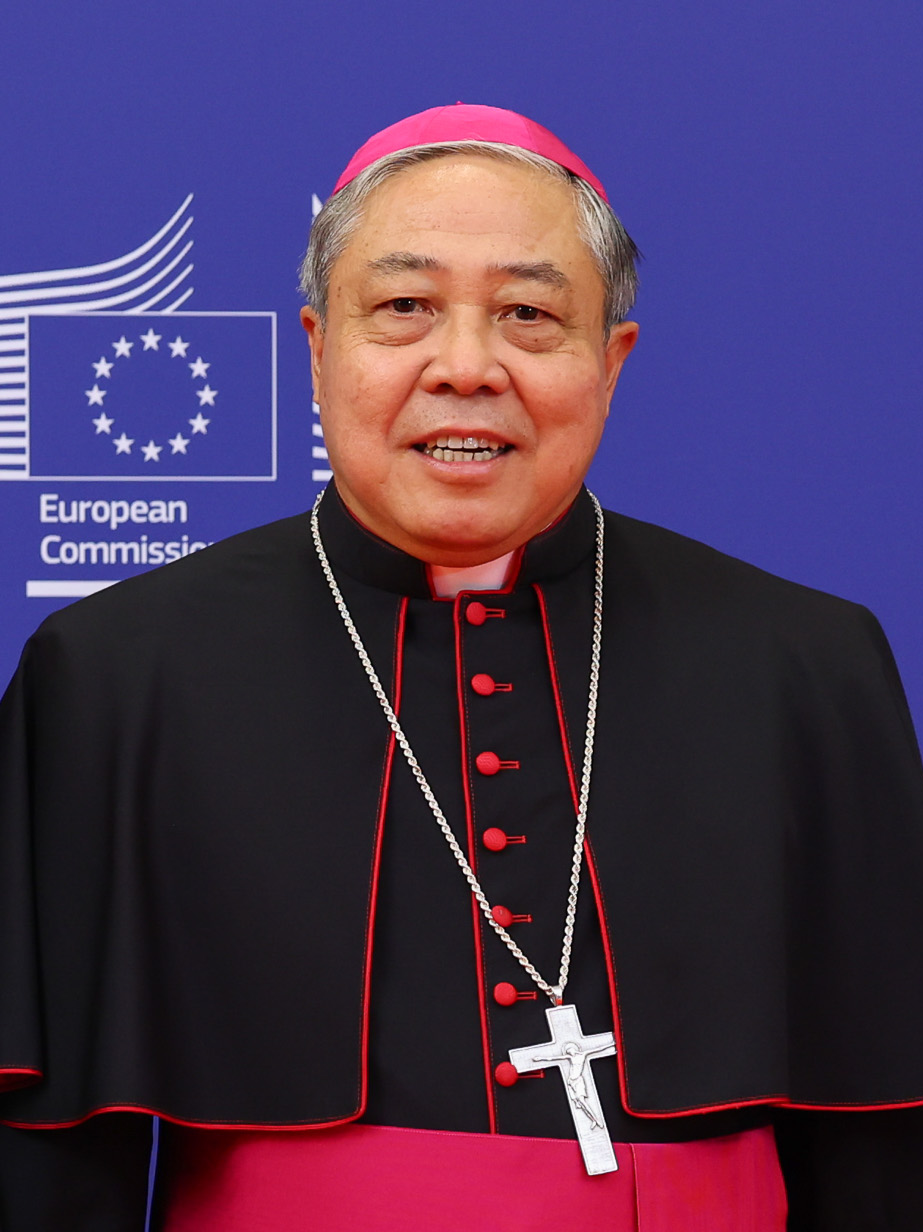
- Archbishop Auza in 2025
- Appointed: 22 March 2025
- Predecessor: Noël Treanor
- Other post: Titular Archbishop of Suacia
- Previous posts: Apostolic Nuncio to Spain and Andorra (2019-2025); Permanent Observer of the Holy See to the United Nations (2014-2019); Apostolic Nuncio to Haiti (2008-2014)

Orders
- Ordination: 29 June 1985 by Daniel Francis Walsh
- Consecration: 3 July 2008 by Tarcisio Bertone

Personal details
- Born: 10 June 1959 (age 67) Talibon, Bohol, Philippines
- Denomination: Roman Catholic
- Motto: UT DILIGATIS INVINCEM ("Love one another.")
- Coat of arms: Bernardito Cleopas Auza's coat of arms

Styles of Bernardito Auza
- Reference style: The Most Reverend
- Spoken style: Your Excellency
- Religious style: Archbishop

Ordination history of Bernardito Auza
History
Episcopal consecration
- Consecrated by: Tarcisio Bertone
- Date: 3 July 2008
Episcopal succession
Bishops consecrated by Bernardito Auza as principal consecrator
- Joseph Gontrand Décoste: 18 October 2009

Bernardito Cleopas Auza (born 10 June 1959) is a Filipino prelate of the Catholic Church. He is the current Apostolic Nuncio to the European Union, appointed to that position on 22 March 2025. Prior to this, he served under the diplomatic service of the Holy See, as well as being the Permanent Observer of the Holy See to the United Nations from 2014 to 2019. He is a member of the Priestly Fraternities of Saint Dominic.

== Early life ==
Bernardito Cleopas Auza was born on 10 June 1959, in Balintawak, Talibon, Bohol, Philippines, the eighth of twelve children of Meliton Garcia Auza and Magdalena Polestico Cleopas. After preliminary education in Talibon, he entered the Immaculate Heart of Mary Seminary in Tagbilaran City. He then enrolled at the University of Santo Tomas, Manila, where he obtained his Licentiate in Philosophy in 1981, Licentiate in Theology in 1986, and Masters in Education also in 1986.

Auza was ordained a priest by Bishop Daniel Francis Walsh of the Roman Catholic Diocese of Santa Rosa in California on 29 June 1985.

At the Pontifical University of Saint Thomas Aquinas (Angelicum), he obtained a Licentiate in Canon Law in 1989 and a Doctorate in Sacred Theology in 1990. He attended the Pontifical Ecclesiastical Academy to prepare for a diplomat's career.

== Diplomatic career ==
He entered the diplomatic service of the Holy See on 1 June 1990 and worked in Madagascar and the South Indian Ocean (1990–93), Bulgaria (1993–96), Albania (1997–98), the Secretariat of State in the Section for Relations with States (1999–2006), and the Permanent Mission of the Holy See to the UN (2006–08).

On 8 May 2008, Pope Benedict XVI named Auza Titular Archbishop of Suacia and Apostolic Nuncio to Haiti. He was consecrated as a bishop on 3 July 2008 by Cardinal Tarcisio Bertone, Secretary of State.

On 2 July 2014, Pope Francis appointed him Permanent Observer to the United Nations in New York representing the Holy See. On 16 July, his responsibilities were expanded to include the role of Permanent Observer to the Organization of American States (OAS).

In October 2014 Auza called for a broad definition of the term “rule of law” that includes respect, dignity, and justice. The rule of law should be “both rationally and morally grounded upon the substantial principles of justice, including the inalienable dignity and value of every human person prior to any law or social consensus,” said Archbishop Berardito Auza, the nuncio, in a statement made during a committee meeting at the UN General Assembly. “As a consequence of the recognition of this dignity, those elements of fundamental justice such as respect for the principle of legality,” Archbishop Auza said, “the presumption of innocence and the right to due process.” Among nations, he added, the rule of law should mean “the paramount respect of human rights, equality of the rights of nations; and respect for international customary law, treaties … and other sources of international law. This definition, with its reference point in the natural law, sidesteps self-referential definitional frameworks and anchors the orientation of the rule of law within the ultimate and essential goal of all law, namely to promote and guarantee the dignity of the human person and the common good.”

In the same speech, he noted the Vatican’s hope that “the alarming, escalating phenomenon of international terrorism, new in some of its expressions and utterly ruthless in its barbarity, be an occasion for a deeper and more urgent study on how to re-enforce the international juridical framework of a multilateral application of our common responsibility to protect people from all forms of unjust aggression.”

His assignment to the OAS ended on 31 August 2019.

Pope Francis appointed him apostolic nuncio to Spain and to Andorra on 1 October 2019.

On 22 March 2025, Pope Francis appointed him as nuncio to the European Union.

== See also ==
- Catholic Church in the Philippines
- List of heads of the diplomatic missions of the Holy See

Catholic Church titles
Preceded by Richard Pates	Titular Archbishop of Suacia; 2008–present	Incumbent
Diplomatic posts
Preceded by Mario Giordana	Apostolic Nuncio to Haiti; 2008–2014	Succeeded by Eugene Nugent
Preceded by Francis Assisi Chullikatt	Permanent Observer of the Holy See to the United Nations; 2014–2019	Succeeded by Gabriele Giordano Caccia
Preceded by Renzo Fratini	Apostolic Nuncio to Spain and Andorra; 2019–2025	Succeeded by Piero Pioppo
Preceded by Noël Treanor	Apostolic Nuncio to the European Union; 2025–present	Incumbent
