= Apostolic Nunciature to Spain =

Diplomatic Mission of the Holy See in Europe

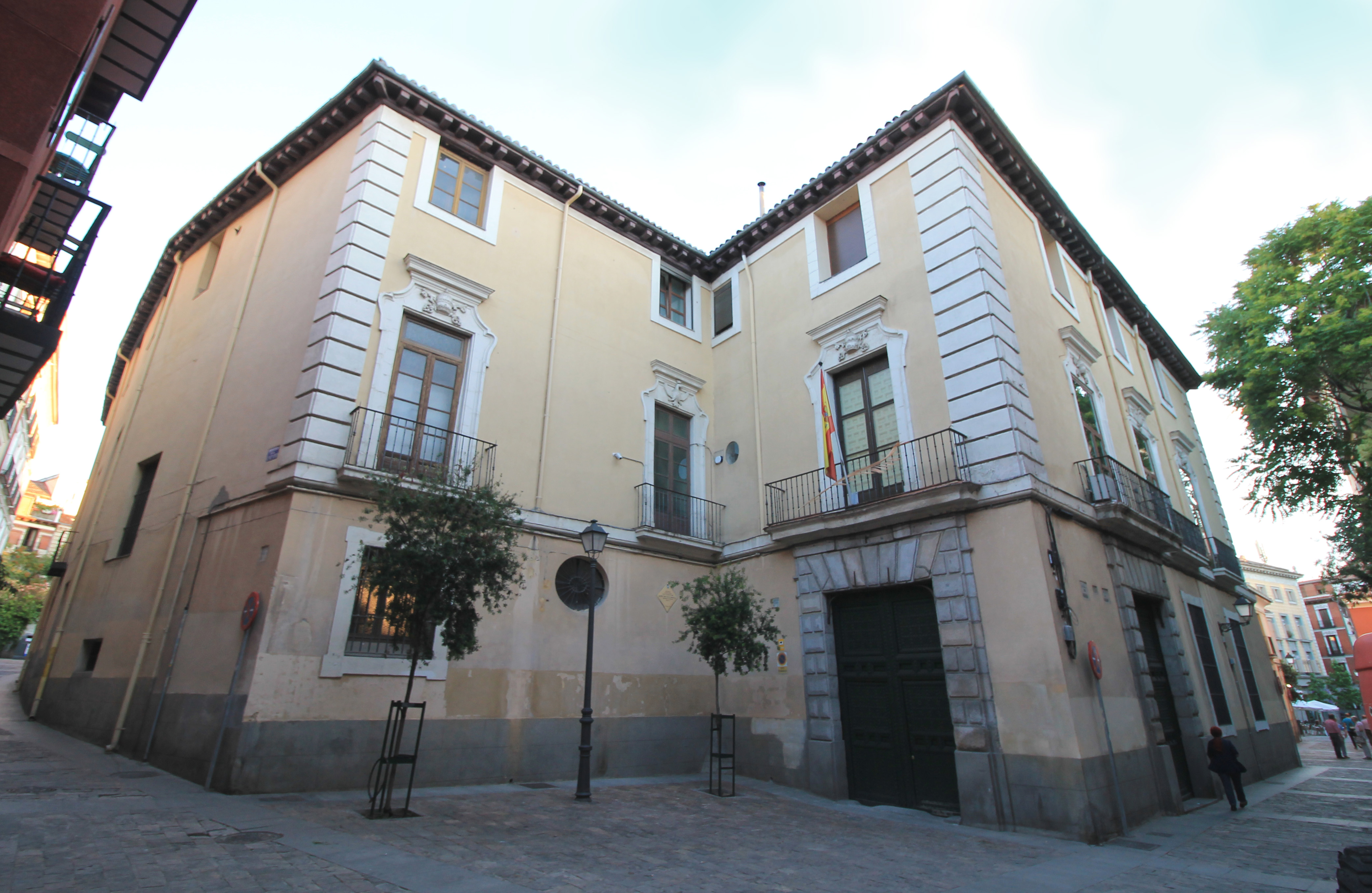
- Location: Madrid
- Apostolic Nuncio: Archbishop Piero Pioppo

The Apostolic Nunciature to the Kingdom of Spain is an ecclesiastical office of the Catholic Church in Spain. It is a diplomatic post of the Holy See, whose representative is called the Apostolic Nuncio with the rank of an ambassador. For much of the 19th and 20th centuries, the holders of the office have gone on to become cardinals with positions in the Roman Curia.

The Apostolic Nuncio to Spain is usually also the Apostolic Nuncio to Andorra upon his appointment to said nation.

== Tribunal of the Rota of the Apostolic Nunciature in Spain ==
The Tribunal of the Rota of the Apostolic Nunciature in Spain (Spanish: Tribunal de la Rota de la Nunciatura Apostólica en España), commonly referred to as the Tribunal de la Rota, is a collegial ordinary appellate court of the Catholic Church situated in Madrid, Spain. Operating under the auspices of Apostolic Nunciature, it is a unique territorial tribunal within the global canon law system, granted as a special historic privilege by the Holy See to the Spanish Church.

The roots of the Spanish Rota date back to the 16th century during the reign of Emperor Charles I of Spain. Documented evidence shows that on April 16, 1529, Pope Clement VII granted extensive judicial faculties to the papal nuncio Girolamo da Schio. By 1537, a permanent "Tribunal of the Nuncio" (Spanish: Tribunal del Nuncio) was operating concurrently with the permanent establishment of the nunciature. This allowed Spanish subjects to resolve internal ecclesiastical disputes locally rather than journeying to the Roman Curia.

The Tribunal of the Rota of the Nunciature in Spain represents a unique exception in the Catholic Church, as Spain is the only territory in the world granted the special privilege of hosting its own ordinary appellate court with the same canonical authority as the Roman Rota in the Vatican.

== List of Apostolic Nuncios to Spain ==
=== 16th century ===
- Giovanni Poggio (July 1529 – December 1551)
- Leonardo Marini, O.P. (24 March 1552 – March 1559)
- Salvatore Pacini (March 1559 – March 1560)
- Ottaviano Raverta (10 March – 28 November 1560)
- Giovanni Campeggi (28 November 1560 – 10 May 1561)
- Ottaviano Raverta (June – October 1561)
- Alessandro Crivelli (November 1561 – November 1565)
- Giovanni Battista Castagna (September 1565 – 3 July 1572)
- Nicolò Ormanetto (1572 – 18 January 1577)
- Filippo Sega (8 July 1577 – February 1581)
- Ludovico Taverna (30 April 1581 – 11 December 1585)
- Cesare Speciano (11 December 1585 – 27 August 1588)
- Annibale de Grassi (27 August 1588 – 24 June 1590)
- Muzio Passamonte (14 July 1590 – January 1591)
- Pietro Millini (January 1591 – 1592)
- Camillo Caetani (1 October 1592 – 1600)

=== 17th century ===
- Domenico Ginnasi (22 February 1600 – 1605)
- Giovanni Garzia Millini (20 June 1605 – 22 May 1607)
- Decio Carafa (22 May 1607 – 17 August 1611)
- Antonio Caetani (27 October 1611 – July 1618)
- Francesco Cennini de' Salamandri (17 July 1618 – 1621)
- Alessandro di Sangro (2 April 1621 – 1622)
- Innocenzo Massimo (23 June 1622 – 1624)
- Giulio Cesare Sacchetti (27 January 1624 – 1626)
- Giovanni Battista Pamphilj (30 May 1626 – 1630)
- Cesare Monti (1 March 1630 – 1634)
- Lorenzo Campeggi (31 January 1634 – 8 August 1639)
- Cesare Facchinetti (8 August 1639 – 1642)
- Giovanni Giacomo Panciroli (18 January 1642 – 1644)
- Giulio Rospigliosi (14 July 1644 – 1652)
- Francesco Caetani (14 September 1652 – December 1653)
- Camillo Massimo (8 January 1654 – November 1656)
- Carlo Bonelli (27 October 1656 – 14 January 1664), First Extraordinary apostolic nuncio, later as ordinary nuncio.
- Vitaliano Visconti (16 August 1664 – February 1668)
- Federico Borromeo (25 February 1668 – July 1670)
- Galeazzo Marescotti (13 August 1670 – 27 May 1675)
- Savio Millini (1 July 1675 – 8 October 1685)
- Marcello Durazzo (5 May 1685 – 2 September 1686)
- Giuseppe Mosti (12 February 1690 – 29 July 1692)
- Federico Caccia (5 January 1693 – 13 May 1696)
- Giuseppe Archinto (13 January 1696 – 18 May 1699)

=== 18th century ===
- Francesco Acquaviva d'Aragona (27 March 1700 – 17 May 1706)
- Antonio Felice Zondadari (28 May 1706 – 1709), expelled. Remained in Avignon for three years.
- Giorgio Spinola (3 July 1711 – 26 May 1713)
- Rupture in diplomatic relations
- Pompeio Aldrovandi (2 January 1717 – 1720)
- Alessandro Aldobrandini (1 July 1720 – 2 October 1730)
- Vincenzo Antonio Alemanni Nasi (23 December 1730 – 26 March 1735)
- Pedro Ayala, O.P. (9 September 1735 – 7 May 1736)
- Silvio Valenti Gonzaga (28 January 1736 – 19 December 1738)
- Giovanni Battista Barni (1 April 1739 – 9 September 1743)
- Enrico Enríquez (8 January 1744 – 26 November 1753)
- Martino Innico Caracciolo (20 December 1753 – 6 August 1754)
- Girolamo Spinola (8 November 1754 – 24 September 1759)
- Lazzaro Opizio Pallavicino (9 February 1760 – 26 September 1766)
- Cesare Alberico Lucini (18 December 1766 – 19 February 1768)
- Sede vacante
- Luigi Valenti Gonzaga (2 September 1773 – 20 May 1776)
- Nicola Colonna di Stigliano (7 June 1776 – 14 February 1785)
- Ippolito Antonio Vincenti Mareri (24 May 1785 – 21 February 1794)
- Filippo Casoni (27 May 1794 – 23 February 1802)

=== 19th century ===
- Pietro Gravina (1 March 1803 – 23 September 1816)
- Giacomo Giustiniani (6 April 1817 – 13 May 1826)
- Francesco Tiberi Contigliano (9 January 1827 – 1 August 1834)
- Luigi Amat di San Filippo e Sorso (13 November 1832 – 1835)
- Rupture in diplomatic relations
- Giovanni Brunelli (22 July 1848 – 7 March 1853)
  - Alessandro Franchi (7 March 1853 – 16 June 1856) (Chargé d'Affaires)
- Lorenzo Barili (16 October 1857 – 13 March 1868)
- Alessandro Franchi (13 March 1868 – June 1869)
- Sede vacante
- Giovanni Simeoni (15 March 1875 – 17 September 1875)
- Giacomo Cattani (28 January 1877 – 19 September 1879)
- Angelo Bianchi (30 September 1879 – 25 September 1882)
- Mariano Rampolla del Tindaro (19 December 1882 – 2 June 1887)
- Angelo Di Pietro (23 May 1887 Appointed – 28 June 1893)
- Serafino Cretoni (9 May 1893 Appointed – 19 April 1896)
- Giuseppe Francica-Nava de Bontifè (25 July 1896 – 19 June 1899)

=== 20th century ===
- Aristide Rinaldini (28 December 1899 – 1907 )
- Antonio Vico (21 October 1907 – 27 November 1911)
- Francesco Ragonesi (9 February 1913 – 7 March 1921)
- Federico Tedeschini (31 March 1921 – 16 December 1935)
- Filippo Cortesi (4 June 1936 – 24 December 1936 appointed Apostolic Nuncio to Poland)
  - Silvio Sericano (11 June 1936 – 4 November 1936) (Charge d'Affaires)
  - Isidro Gomá y Tomás (19 December 1936 – 21 September 1937) (Charge d'Affaires)
  - Ildebrando Antoniutti (21 September 1937 – 1938) (Charge d'Affaires)
- Gaetano Cicognani (16 May 1938 – 7 December 1953)
- Ildebrando Antoniutti (21 October 1953 – 19 March 1962)
- Antonio Riberi (28 April 1962 – 16 December 1967 )
- Luigi Dadaglio (8 July 1967 – 4 October 1980)
- Antonio Innocenti (4 October 1980 – 25 May 1985 )
- Mario Tagliaferri (20 July 1985 – 13 July 1995)
- Lajos Kada (22 September 1995 – 1 March 2000 )

=== 21st century ===
- Manuel Monteiro de Castro (1 March 2000 – 3 July 2009)
- Renzo Fratini (20 August 2009 – 4 July 2019)
- Bernardito Auza (1 October 2019 – 22 March 2025)
- Piero Pioppo (15 September 2025 – present)

== See also ==
- Holy See–Spain relations
- Foreign relations of the Holy See
- List of diplomatic missions of the Holy See
