= Lajos Kada =

Hungarian prelate

His Excellency, The Most Reverend Lajos Kada
- Apostolic Nuncio of Andorra and Apostolic Nuncio of Spain

Orders
- Ordination: 10 October 1948
- Consecration: 20 July 1975 by Jean-Marie Villot, Giovanni Benelli and Corrado Bafile

Personal details
- Born: Lajos Kada; 16 November 1924 Budapest, Hungary
- Died: 26 November 2001 (aged 77) Budapest, Hungary
- Denomination: Roman Catholic

Styles of Lajos Kada
- Reference style: His Excellency; The Most Reverend
- Spoken style: Your Excellency
- Religious style: Archbishop

Lajos Kada (16 November 1924 – 26 November 2001) was a Hungarian prelate of the Catholic Church who spent most of his career in the diplomatic service of the Holy See, serving also in the Roman Curia.

== Biography ==
Lajos Kada was born in Budapest, Hungary, on 16 November 1924. He was ordained a priest on 10 October 1948.

To prepare for a diplomatic career he entered the Pontifical Ecclesiastical Academy in 1955. He was the Academy's first Hungarian student. He entered the diplomatic service of the Holy See in 1957 and worked in the diplomatic missions in Pakistan, Scandinavia (based in Denmark), Germany (Bonn), and Argentina.

He was working at the Pontifical Council Cor Unum when, on 20 June 1975, Pope Paul VI named him a titular archbishop and Apostolic Nuncio to Costa Rica. He received his episcopal consecration from Cardinal Jean-Marie Villot on 20 July 1975.

On 15 October 1980, Pope John Paul II appointed him Apostolic Nuncio to El Salvador as well.

On 8 April 1984, Pope John Paul moved him to the Roman Curia, naming him Secretary of the Congregation of the Sacraments.

On 22 August 1991, Pope John Paul returned him to the diplomatic corps, appointing him Apostolic Nuncio to Germany.

On 22 September 1995, Pope John Paul named him Apostolic Nuncio to Spain, to which he added, on 8 March 1996, the responsibilities of Apostolic Nuncio to Andorra. His tenure in Spain was marked by disputes with the government about religious education and church finances; he made his hostility to Catalan nationalism clear as well.

He retired when replaced as Apostolic Nuncio to Spain and Andorra on 1 March 2000.

After years of fighting cancer, Kada died in Budapest on 26 November 2001.
