= Botriana =

Locality and archaeological site in Tunisia

Botriana is a locality and archaeological site in Tunisia

== History ==
Africa Proconsularis (125 AD)

During the Roman Empire, Botriana was a civitas in the Roman province of Africa Proconsolaris. The town was known to have flourished from 30BC to about AD640.

The town was also the seat of an ancient Catholic bishopric, suffragan to Archdiocese of Carthage.

Only one bishop from ancient Botriana is known and that was the Donatist Bishop Donatus who represented the bishopric at the Council of Carthage (411). He claimed there was no Catholic competitor in his diocese. Today Botriana survives as titular bishopric and the current bishop is Renzo Fratini, of Spain and Andorra.
