= Apostolic Nunciature to Indonesia =

Diplomatic post of the Holy See

Apostolic Nunciature to Indonesia Nunsiatur Apostolik untuk Indonesia
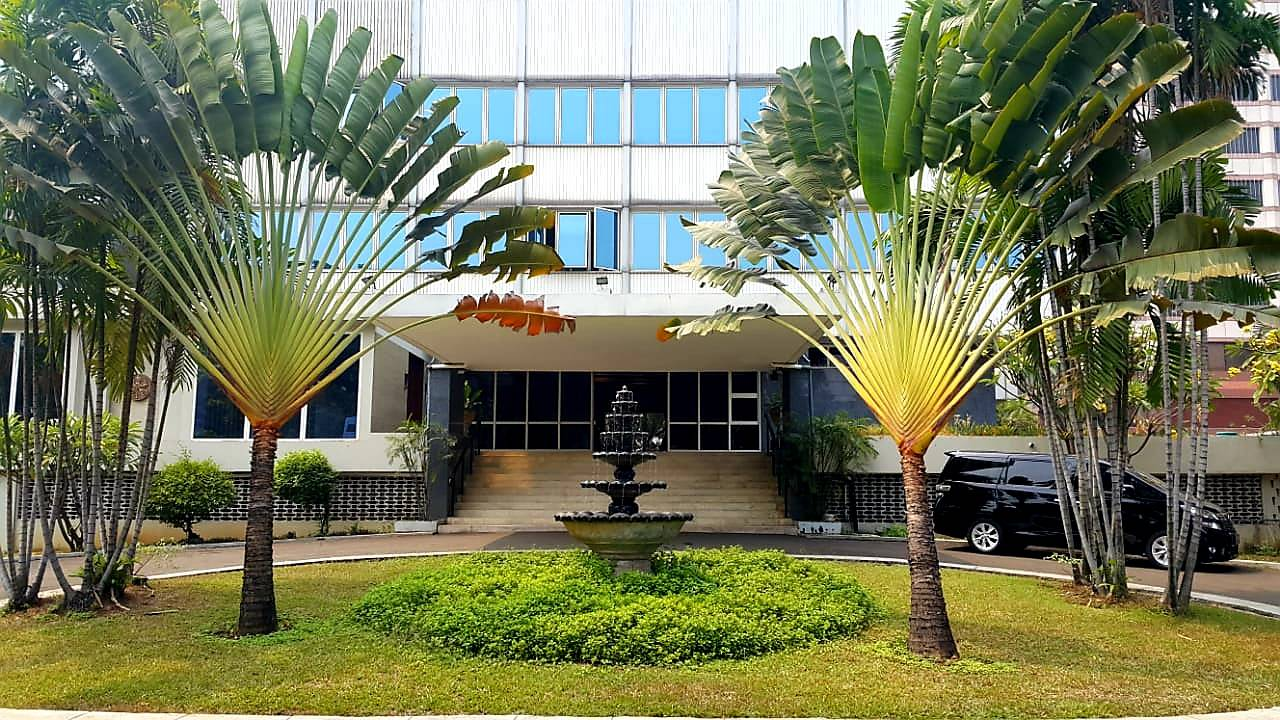
- Location: Jakarta, Indonesia
- Address: Jl. Medan Merdeka Timur 18, Central Jakarta
- Coordinates: 6.1800°S 106.8328°E
- Apostolic Nuncio: Walter Erbì
- Website: nunciatureindonesia.org

The Apostolic Nunciature to Indonesia (Indonesian: Nunsiatur Apostolik untuk Indonesia), unofficially known as the Vatican Embassy in Jakarta (Indonesian: Kedutaan Besar Vatikan di Jakarta) is a diplomatic position within the Vatican, equivalent to an embassy. It is located at Jalan Merdeka Timur 18 in Central Jakarta.

The apostolic nuncio of the Holy See to the Republic of Indonesia serves both as the ambassador of the pope (as head of state of Vatican City) to the president of Indonesia, and as delegate and point-of-contact between the Catholic hierarchy in Indonesia and the pope (as head of the church).

== List of papal representatives ==
Apostolic delegates

- Georges-Marie de Jonghe d'Ardoye (6 July 1947 – 2 March 1955)

Apostolic internuncios

- Domenico Enrici (17 September 1955 – 30 January 1958)
- Ottavio De Liva (18 April 1962 – 23 August 1965)

Apostolic pro-nuncio

- Salvatore Pappalardo (7 December 1965 – 7 May 1969)

Apostolic nuncios

- Joseph Mees (14 June 1969 - 10 July 1973)
- Vincenzo Maria Farano (8 August 1973 – 25 August 1979)
- Pablo Puente Buces (18 March 1980 – 15 March 1986)
- Francesco Canalini (28 May 1986 – 20 July 1991)
- Pietro Sambi (28 November 1991 – 6 June 1998)
- Renzo Fratini (8 August 1998 – 27 January 2004)
- Malcolm Ranjith (29 April 2004 – 10 December 2005)
- Leopoldo Girelli (13 April 2006 – 13 January 2011)
- Antonio Guido Filipazzi (23 March 2011–26 April 2017)
- Piero Pioppo (8 September 2017 – 15 September 2025)
- Walter Erbì (1 July 2026 – present)

== See also ==
- Holy See–Indonesia relations
- Catholic Church in Indonesia
