= Apostolic Nunciature to Andorra =

Diplomatic Mission of the Holy See

The Apostolic Nunciature to Andorra is an ecclesiastical office of the Catholic Church in Andorra. It is a diplomatic post of the Holy See, whose representative is called the Apostolic Nuncio with the rank of an ambassador. The title Apostolic Nuncio to Andorra so far has always been held by the prelate appointed Apostolic Nuncio to Spain and resides in Spain.

== List of papal representatives to Andorra ==
Apostolic Nuncios

- Lajos Kada (6 March 1996 – 1 March 2000)
- Manuel Monteiro de Castro (1 March 2000 – 3 July 2009)
- Renzo Fratini (20 August 2009 – 4 July 2019)
- Bernardito Auza (1 October 2019 – 22 March 2025)
- Piero Pioppo (15 September 2025 – present)
