= Pier Luigi Mazzoni =

Italian Roman Catholic archbishop

- Archbishop of Gaeta
- Church: Catholic Church
- Archdiocese: Archdiocese of Gaeta
- In office: 12 February 1997 – 20 September 2007
- Predecessor: Vincenzo Maria Farano
- Successor: Fabio Bernardo D'Onorio
- Previous post: Bishop of Ascoli Piceno (1991-1997)

Orders
- Ordination: 18 February 1958
- Consecration: 18 May 1991 by Bernardin Gantin

Personal details
- Born: 3 August 1932 Dovadola, Province of Forlì-Cesena, Kingdom of Italy
- Died: 12 July 2012 (aged 79) Formia, Province of Latina, Italy
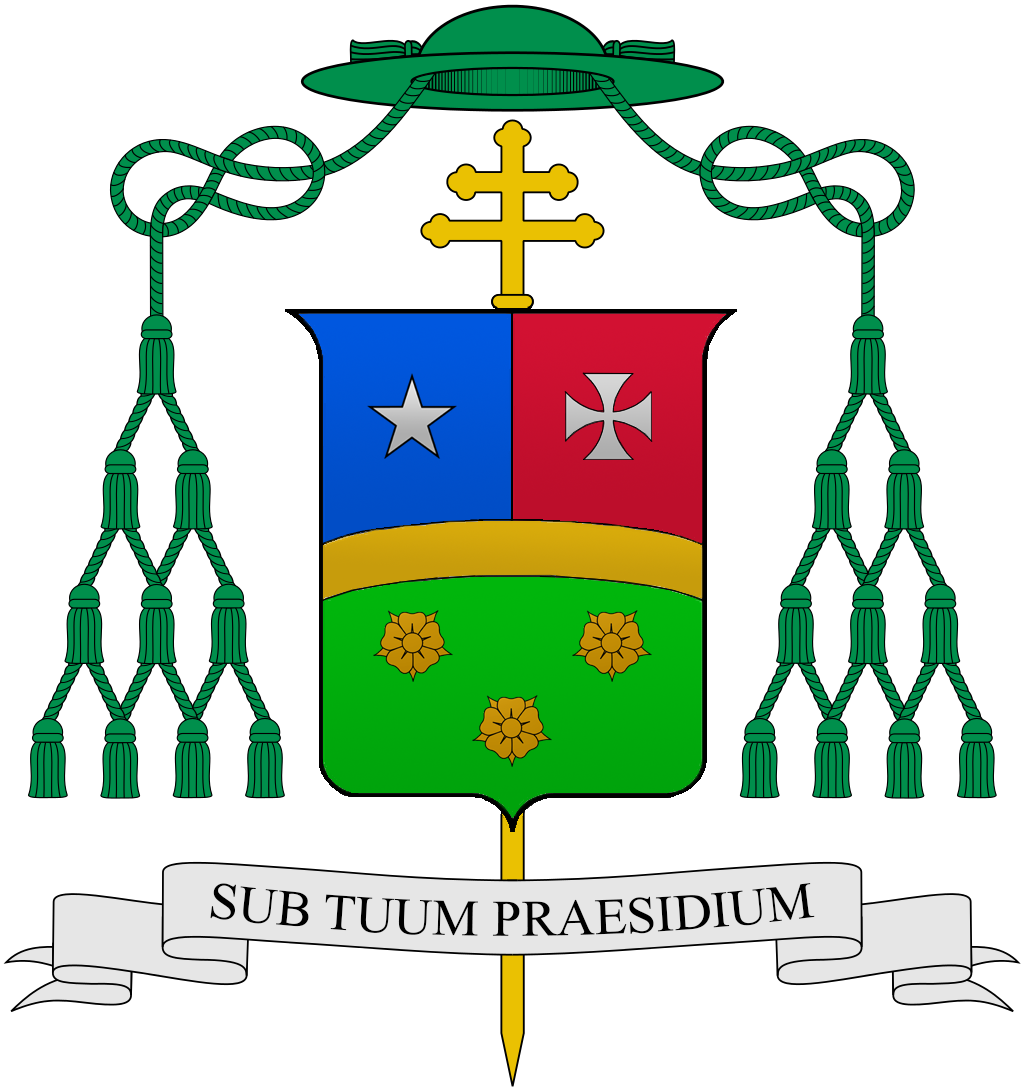
- Coat of arms

Pier Luigi Mazzoni (August 3, 1932 – July 12, 2012) was the Roman Catholic archbishop of the Roman Catholic Archdiocese of Gaeta, Italy.

Ordained to the priesthood in 1958, Mazzoni became a bishop in 1991 and retired in 2007.
