= Giarola =

Giarola is a surname. Notable people with the surname include:

- Antonio Giarola (1590s–1665), Italian painter
- Giovanni Giarola (1518–1557), Italian painter
