= Malcolm Ranjith =

Sri Lankan Roman Catholic cardinal (born 1947)

His Eminence Malcolm Ranjith
- Cardinal, Archbishop of Colombo
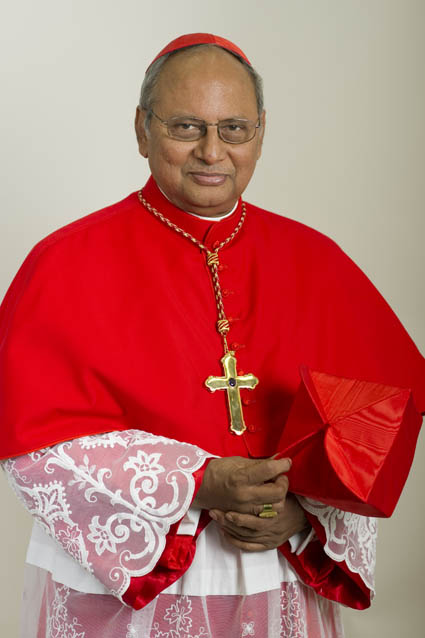
- Archdiocese: Colombo
- Province: Colombo
- See: Colombo, Sri Lanka
- Appointed: 16 June 2009
- Installed: 5 August 2009
- Predecessor: Oswald Gomis
- Other post: Cardinal-Priest of S. Lorenzo in Lucina
- Previous posts: Auxiliary Bishop of Colombo (1991–1995); Titular Bishop of Cabarsussi (1991–1995); Bishop of Ratnapura (1995–2001); Adjunct Secretary of the Congregation for the Evangelization of Peoples (2001–2004); Apostolic Nuncio to Indonesia (2004–2005); Apostolic Nuncio to Timor-Leste (2004–2005); Titular Archbishop of Umbriatico (2004–2009); Secretary of the Congregation for Divine Worship and the Discipline of the Sacraments (2005–2009)

Orders
- Ordination: 29 June 1975 by Pope Paul VI
- Consecration: 17 June 1991 by Nicholas Fernando
- Created cardinal: 20 November 2010 by Benedict XVI
- Rank: Cardinal Priest

Personal details
- Born: Patabendige Don Albert Malcolm Ranjith; 15 November 1947 (age 78) Polgahawela, British Ceylon
- Denomination: Roman Catholic
- Parents: William and Mary Winifreeda
- Motto: Verbum caro factum est ('The Word was made flesh')
- Coat of arms

Styles of Malcolm Ranjith
- Reference style: His Eminence; The Most Reverend Eminence
- Spoken style: Your Eminence
- Religious style: Cardinal
- Informal style: Cardinal

Patabendige Don Albert Malcolm Ranjith (Sinhala: පටබැඳිගේ දොන් ඇල්බට් මැල්කම් රංජිත්; born 15 November 1947) is a Sri Lankan Catholic prelate who has served as Archbishop of Colombo since 2009. He was made a cardinal in 2010.

Ranjith previously served as auxiliary bishop of Colombo (1991–1995), Bishop of Ratnapura (1995–2001), Adjunct Secretary of the Congregation for the Evangelization of Peoples (2001–2004), Apostolic Nuncio to Indonesia and East Timor (2004–2005), and Secretary of the Congregation for Divine Worship and the Discipline of the Sacraments (2005–2009).

== Early life and education ==
Malcolm Ranjith was born on 15 November 1947 in Polgahawela, in what was then British Ceylon, to Patabendige Don William and Hettiarachchige Mary Winifred Perera. He had three younger sisters. Ranjith attributed his first interest in becoming a priest to the example set by a French missionary priest assigned to his parish. He studied in Rome, earning a degree in theology from the Pontifical Urban College and a licentiate from the Pontifical Biblical Institute in 1978, followed by postdoctoral work at the Hebrew University in Jerusalem.

On 29 June 1975, Ranjith was ordained to the priesthood by Pope Paul VI in St. Peter's Square. Later he joined the tutorial staff of St. Thomas' College, Kotte.

== First appointments in Sri Lanka ==
Pope St. John Paul II appointed him auxiliary bishop of Colombo, Sri Lanka, and titular bishop of Cabarsussi on 17 June 1991. He received his episcopal consecration on 31 August 1991 from Nicholas Fernando, Archbishop of Colombo.

In 1994, Ranjith led a commission that denounced the theological work of Sri Lankan theologian Tissa Balasuriya. He charged that Balasuriya had questioned original sin and the divinity of Christ, as well as supported women's ordination. Ranjith was supported in this position by Cardinal Ratzinger (later Pope Benedict XVI).

He was responsible for coordinating the visit of Pope John Paul to Sri Lanka in January 1995. On 2 November 1995 Pope St. John Paul named him the first bishop of the newly created Diocese of Ratnapura, Sri Lanka.

== Diplomatic and curial posts ==
On 1 October 2001 Pope John Paul assigned him to the post of adjunct secretary of the Congregation for the Evangelization of Peoples. He was also named head of the Pontifical Mission Societies.

He was appointed titular archbishop of Umbriatico and the Apostolic Nuncio to Indonesia and to East Timor on 29 April 2004. His appointment was unusual in that, unlike almost all nuncios, he was not a graduate of the Pontifical Ecclesiastical Academy. Ranjith was the first Sri Lankan to be appointed an apostolic nuncio.

Ranjith was appointed secretary of the Congregation for Divine Worship and the Discipline of the Sacraments on 10 December 2005. He developed a reputation as a liturgical conservative. He held that receiving communion in the hand was an "illegitimate" practice never envisioned by the Second Vatican Council. He criticized bishops who did not promptly make provision for the celebration of Mass in Latin when Pope Benedict authorized it in 2006, calling it "rebellion against the pope".

He once said, "I'm not a fan of the Lefebvrians ... but what they sometimes say about the liturgy they say for good reason."

Ranjith is fluent in eleven languages: Italian, French, German, Hebrew, Indonesian, Greek, Spanish, Latin, English, Sinhala and Tamil.

Styles of Albert Malcolm Ranjith
- Reference style: His Eminence
- Spoken style: Your Eminence
- Informal style: Cardinal
- See: Colombo

== Archbishop of Colombo ==
On 16 June 2009, Pope Benedict XVI appointed him Metropolitan Archbishop of Colombo.

Ranjith was among 34 metropolitan archbishops to receive his pallium from Pope Benedict on the Feast of Saints Peter and Paul on 29 June 2009.

On 7 October 2009, Ranjith issued liturgical guidelines for his diocese. These included a recommendation for "all faithful, including the religious, to receive Holy Communion reverently kneeling and on the tongue", as well as laymen being forbidden from preaching.

== Cardinal ==
On 20 October 2010, Pope Benedict XVI announced he would make Ranjith a cardinal at a consistory scheduled for 20 November 2010. He was given the rank of Cardinal-Priest of San Lorenzo in Lucina.

Ranjith participated as a cardinal-elector in the 2013 conclave which elected Pope Francis.

Ranjith is a member of the Congregation for Divine Worship and the Discipline of the Sacraments and of the Congregation for the Evangelization of Peoples.

He has been considered to be papabile by observers, meaning that he is thought of as a potential next Pope.

In October 2024, Ranjith banned priests from allowing women to serve at the altar, stating that male altar servers are "one of the main sources of vocations to the priesthood in Sri Lanka, and it will affect the number of candidates entering the seminaries, [the risk of which] we cannot take."

Ranjith was once again a cardinal elector and a strong papabile in the 2025 papal conclave that elected Pope Leo XIV.

== Views ==
=== Homosexuality ===
Ranjith has accused that some groups in Sri Lanka are working to spread homosexuality, with support from foreign organizations. He stated that a series of programmes on homosexual rights are being promoted across the country with foreign aid. He also claimed that a campaign to recruit young people for these organisations is currently underway. Ranjith further alleged that some mental health doctors, with the support of the Health Ministry, are issuing certificates that allow individuals to change their gender and obtain new birth certificates. He claimed that this is a secret programme to destabilise the institution of marriage and that some political parties are also supporting it.

In July 2024, Ranjith voiced his opposition to the introduction of two bills aimed at supporting same-sex marriages in Sri Lanka. The Catholic Church in Sri Lanka does not support or recognise same-sex marriages, with Cardinal Malcolm Ranjith stating in 2025 that same-sex marriages "are not a human right". He also accused Western countries of spreading immoral propaganda in Sri Lanka and asserted that the nation has its own culture, which its people should protect. While Ranjith framed Western influence as a source of "immoral propaganda," Catholicism itself was introduced to Sri Lanka during the colonial period by Portuguese missionaries.

Ranjith's anti-LGBT statements have increased since 2025. He continues to oppose gay rights, repeatedly claiming that 'homosexuality is a mental illness,' especially after the Sri Lankan government announced in September 2025 that it planned to promote the country as an LGBT-friendly travel destination.

Ranjith is notable for speaking of his anti-LGBT views whenever he has an opportunity to speak, particularly during sermons and public gatherings. Public reactions have been mixed: some praise him, while others criticize him for focusing more on homosexuality than on issues such as 2019 Sri Lanka Easter bombings. He has repeatedly asked, "how can this be a human right? How can two men form a family? How can they have children?"—ignoring the fact that same-sex couples can have children through adoption or in vitro fertilization.

=== Corporal Punishment ===
In 2025, the Sri Lankan government proposed legislation to ban corporal punishment in Sri Lanka. Ranjith expressed his criticism of the proposed law, stating that such measures could lead to unintended consequences—such as children filing complaints against their parents and teachers for disciplining them through corporal punishment.

He further remarked that similar laws exist in Western countries and criticized Westerners for being free thinkers rather than adhering to religious traditions. Ranjith voiced his opposition to adopting what he described as Western concepts that, in his view, do not align with Sri Lanka's cultural and religious values. He emphasized that Sri Lanka has its own traditions and should avoid creating unnecessary social issues by imitating foreign models.

=== Females as Altar Servers ===
In October 2024, Ranjith issued a directive banning females from serving as altar servers within his archdiocese. In a letter dated 22 October 2024, addressed to the priests of his diocese, he stated: "No girls should be invited to serve at the altar, as altar servers in the archdiocese." He argued that the role of altar server is a potential pathway to the priesthood, which is reserved for males in the Catholic Church, and that allowing girls to serve could negatively impact vocations.

Ranjith emphasized that "it should always be young boys" who take on the role, citing concerns about the number of candidates entering seminaries. The directive drew criticism, particularly in light of Pope Francis's 2021 decision to formally permit girls to serve as altar servers. Ranjith's stance was seen by some as reflecting his more conservative theological leanings, and he has been described by some observers as the "little Ratzinger".

Catholic Church titles
Preceded by Arnaldo Clemente Canale	— TITULAR — Titular Bishop of Cabarsussi; 17 June 1991 – 2 November 1995	Succeeded by José María Pinheiro
Diocese created	Bishop of Ratnapura; 2 November 1995 – 1 October 2001	Succeeded by Harold Anthony Perera
Position created	Adjunct Secretary of the Congregation for the Evangelization of Peoples; 1 October 2001 – 29 April 2004	Succeeded by Henryk Hoser
Preceded by Joseph Hisajiro Matsunaga	— TITULAR — Titular Archbishop of Umbriatico; 29 April 2004 – 16 June 2009	Succeeded by Santo Rocco Gangemi
Preceded by Domenico Sorrentino	Secretary of the Congregation for Divine Worship and the Discipline of the Sacraments; 10 December 2005 – 16 June 2009	Succeeded by Joseph Augustine Di Noia
Preceded by Oswald Thomas Colman Gomis	Archbishop of Colombo; 16 June 2009 –	Incumbent
Preceded by Joseph Vianney Fernando	President of the Sri Lankan Episcopal Conference; 22 April 2010 – 21 February 2017	Succeeded by Julian Winston Sebastian Fernando
Preceded by Luigi Poggi	Cardinal-Priest of San Lorenzo in Lucina; 20 November 2010 –	Incumbent
No prior officeholder	Vice-President of the Federation of Asian Bishops' Conferences; 1 January 2019 – 31 December 2024	Succeeded by Pablo Virgilio David
Diplomatic posts
Preceded by Renzo Fratini	Apostolic Nuncio to Indonesia; 29 April 2004 – 10 December 2005	Succeeded by Leopoldo Girelli
Preceded by Renzo Fratini	Apostolic Nuncio to Timor-Leste; 29 April 2004 – 10 December 2005	Succeeded by Leopoldo Girelli
