= Thomas Cooray =

Sri Lankan cardinal (1901-1988)

Servant of God Thomas Benjamin Cooray OMI
- Archbishop Emeritus of Colombo
- Church: Roman Catholic Church
- Archdiocese: Colombo
- Metropolis: Colombo
- See: Colombo
- Installed: 26 July 1947
- Term ended: 2 September 1976
- Predecessor: Jean-Marie Masson, OMI
- Successor: Nicholas Fernando
- Other post: Cardinal-Priest of Santi Nereo e Achilleo (1965-1988)
- Previous posts: Titular Archbishop of Perslavus (1945-1947); Coadjutor Archbishop of Colombo (1945-1947); President of the Sri Lankan Episcopal Conference (1970-1977)

Orders
- Ordination: 23 June 1929
- Consecration: 14 December 1945 by Leo Peter Kierkels
- Created cardinal: 22 February 1965 by Pope Paul VI
- Rank: Cardinal-Priest

Personal details
- Born: Thomas Benjamin Cooray; December 28, 1901 Negombo, Ceylon
- Died: 29 October 1988 (aged 86) Colombo, Sri Lanka
- Buried: Basilica of Our Lady of Lanka
- Motto: Ministrare non ministrari ("To serve, not to be served")

Thomas Benjamin Cooray (Sinhala language: තෝමස් බෙන්ජමින් කුරේ), OMI (28 December 1901 – 29 October 1988) was a Sri Lankan cardinal of the Roman Catholic Church who served as the Archbishop of Colombo from 1947 to 1976. Pope Paul VI made him a cardinal in 1965.

His cause of beatification commenced in 2010 and he has been bestowed with the title of Servant of God.

== Biography ==
=== Early life and priesthood ===
Thomas Benjamin Cooray was born to a poor but religious family in Negombo, and attended St. Aloysius Seminary in Borella, and St. Joseph's College and University College in Colombo (University of London) before going to Rome, where he studied at the Pontifical University of St. Thomas Aquinas (Angelicum), obtaining a doctorate in philosophy summa cum laude. After entering the Oblates of Mary Immaculate, he was ordained to the priesthood on June 23, 1929. Finishing his Roman studies in 1931, he then did pastoral work in Colombo until 1945, whilst teaching at St. Joseph's College and serving as a university chaplain. He also became rector of the Oblate seminary in Sri Lanka.

=== Episcopate ===
On December 14, 1945, Cooray was appointed Coadjutor Archbishop of Colombo and Titular Archbishop of Preslavus by Pope Pius XII. He received his episcopal consecration on March 7, 1946 from Archbishop Leo Kierkels, with Bishops Edmund Peiris, OMI, and Bernardo Regno, OSB, serving as co-consecrators. Cooray succeeded the late Jean-Marie Masson, OMI, as Archbishop of Colombo on July 26, 1947, becoming the first local-born head of the see. During his tenure as Archbishop, he "favored a respectful dialogue with the Buddhists and with other Christians". From 1962 to 1965, he attended the Second Vatican Council, at which he supported the Coetus Internationalis Patrum.

=== Cardinalate and death ===
Pope Paul VI created him Cardinal Priest of Santi Nereo e Achilleo in the consistory of February 22, 1965. Cooray, the first Sri Lankan member of the College of Cardinals, resigned as Colombo's archbishop on September 2, 1976, after a period of twenty-nine years. He was one of the cardinal electors who participated in the conclaves of August and October 1978, which selected Popes John Paul I and John Paul II respectively, and the first Sri Lankan to participate in the election of a Pope.

Whenever he came to his native town, he would visit his mother's grave.

Cooray died at age 86. He is buried in the crypt of the Basilica of Our Lady of Lanka, whose completion he oversaw.

=== Cause of beatification ===
In the first step towards sainthood, Pope Benedict XVI declared him to be a Servant of God on 22 November 2010 after the Congregation for the Causes of Saints gave its approval to begin the beatification process.

Styles of Thomas Cooray
- Reference style: His Eminence
- Spoken style: Your Eminence
- Informal style: Cardinal
- See: Colombo (Emeritus)

Catholic Church titles
| Preceded by Jean-Marie Masson | Archbishop of Colombo; 1947–1976 | Succeeded by Nicholas Fernando |
