= Gianola =

Gianola is a surname. Notable people with the surname include:

- Daniel Gianola (born 1947), American geneticist
- Ezio Gianola (born 1960), Italian motorcycle road racer
- Gaetano Gianola, Italian-American mobster
- Jeff Gianola (born 1955), American news anchor

== See also ==
- Giarola
