= Piero Pioppo =

Italian prelate of the Catholic Church (born 1960)

His Excellency, The Most Reverend Piero Pioppo
- Apostolic Nuncio to Spain and Andorra; Titular Archbishop of Torcello
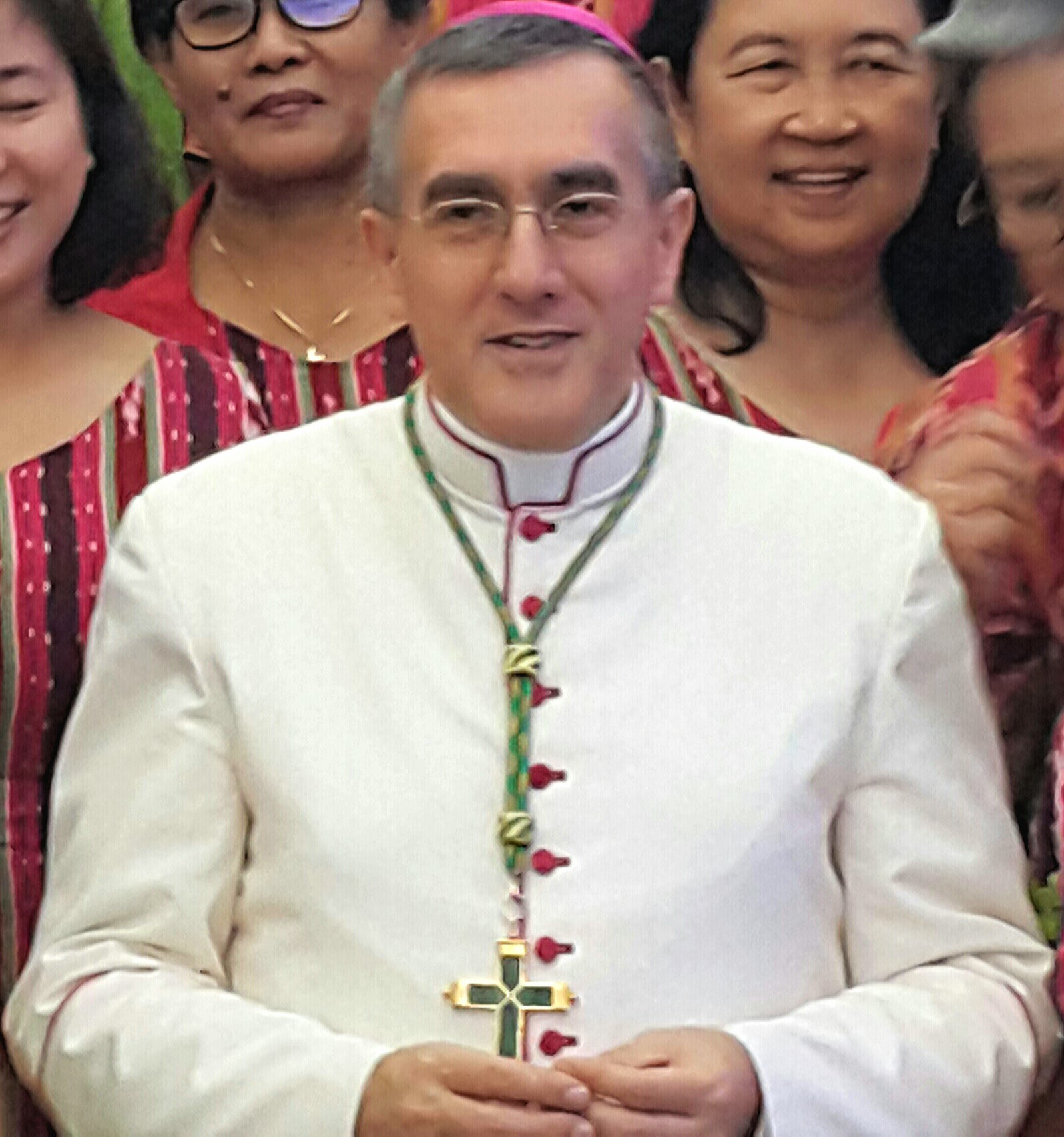
- Piero Pioppo in February 2018
- Appointed: 15 September 2025
- Predecessor: Bernardito Auza
- Other post: Titular Archbishop of Torcello
- Previous posts: Apostolic Nuncio to Indonesia and ASEAN (2017-2025); Apostolic Nuncio to Cameroon and Equatorial Guinea (2010-2017)

Orders
- Ordination: 10 October 1987 by Giuseppe Siri
- Consecration: 18 March 2010 by Pope Benedict XVI, Angelo Sodano, and Tarcisio Bertone

Personal details
- Born: 29 September 1960 (age 66) Savona, Liguria, Italy
- Motto: Quasi lignum super aquas (As a tree by the waters)
- Coat of arms

Styles of Piero Pioppo
- Reference style: His Excellency; The Most Reverend
- Spoken style: Your Excellency
- Religious style: Archbishop

Piero Pioppo (born 29 September 1960) is an Italian prelate of the Catholic Church, who has worked in the diplomatic service of the Holy See since 1993. He has held the titles of nuncio and archbishop since 2010.

== Biography ==
Piero Pioppo was born in Savona, in Liguria, on 29 September 1960. He studied at the Pontifical Theological Faculty of Turin.

Piero Pioppo was ordained a priest on 28 June 1985 for the diocese of Acqui First named vicar of a parish at Carcare, he was sent to Rome to continue his studies. He has a degree in dogmatic theology and a degree in canon law from the Pontifical Gregorian University. For a year, he taught Catholic Theology in Alessandria.

== Diplomatic career ==
In 1991 he completed the course of study at the Pontifical Ecclesiastical Academy. He joined the diplomatic service of the Holy See on 1 July 1993 and then filled assignments in South Korea and Chile, and then in Rome in the General Affairs Section of the Secretariat of State. At the end of 1999, he became the private secretary to Cardinal Angelo Sodano, the Secretary of State.

From 2006 to 2010 he was prelate of the Institute for the Works of Religion (IOR), serving as secretary for the Commission of Cardinals that oversees the IOR.

On 25 January 2010, Pioppo was named apostolic nuncio to Cameroon and Equatorial Guinea and titular archbishop of Torcello. (Note: Some media observers wrote that his move to Cameroon was part of the new Secretary of State removing his predecessor's allies.) On 18 March he received his episcopal consecration from Cardinal Tarcisio Bertone, the secretary of state.

On 8 September 2017, Pope Francis appointed him apostolic nunciature to Indonesia and on 19 March 2018 also the role of nuncio to the Association of Southeast Asian Nations (ASEAN). (Note: The role of Nuncio to ASEAN was previously exercised by the nuncio to Singapore.)

He led the delegation of the Holy See to the October 2018 conference in Bali "Our Ocean, Our Legacy", Pioppo then organized Pope Francis' meeting with Indonesian Maritime Affairs and Fisheries Minister Susi Pudjiastuti in December at which Francis endorsed her aggressive program to restrict illegal fishing.

On 15 September 2025, Pope Leo XIV appointed him nuncio to Spain and Andorra. He presented his Letters of Credence to King Philip VI of Spain on 18 December 2025.

== See also ==
- List of heads of the diplomatic missions of the Holy See
