= Renzo Fratini =

Italian prelate

His Excellency, The Most Reverend Renzo Fratini
- Apostolic Nuncio emeritus to Spain and Andorra; Titular Archbishop of Botriana
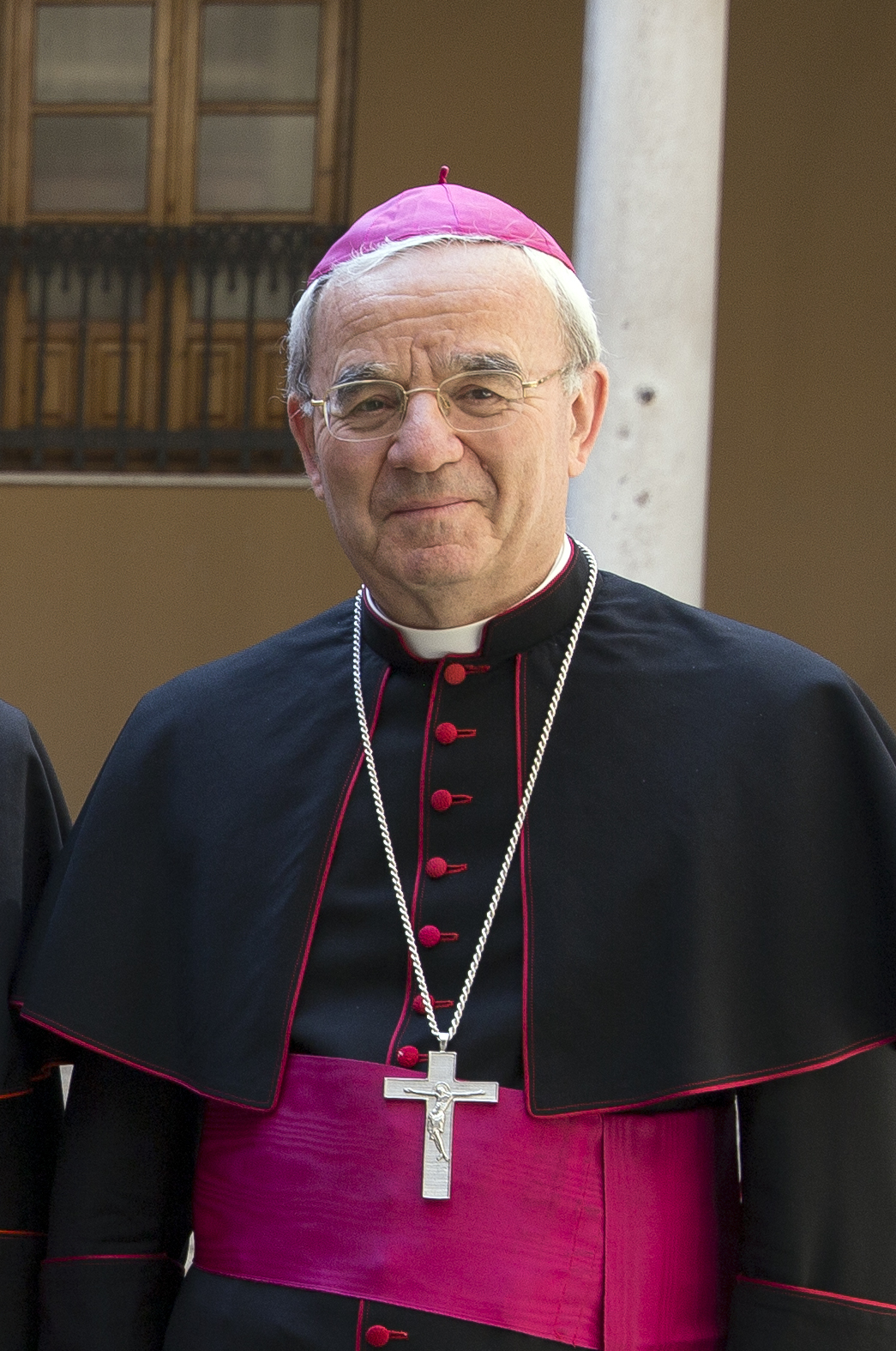
- Appointed: 20 August 2009
- Retired: 4 July 2019
- Predecessor: Manuel Monteiro de Castro
- Successor: Bernardito Auza
- Other post: Titular Archbishop of Botriana
- Previous posts: Permanent Observer to WTO (2009-2016); Apostolic Nuncio to Nigeria (2004-2009); Apostolic Nuncio to Indonesia and Timor-Leste (1998-2004); Apostolic Pro-Nuncio to Pakistan (1993-1998)

Orders
- Ordination: 6 September 1969 by Ersilio Tonini
- Consecration: 2 October 1993 by Angelo Sodano, Crescenzio Sepe and Francesco Tarcisio Carboni

Personal details
- Born: Renzo Fratini; 25 April 1944 (age 82) Urbisaglia, Italy
- Denomination: Roman Catholic
- Motto: SPIRITUS SANCTI VIRTUTE
- Coat of arms

Styles of Renzo Fratini
- Reference style: His Excellency; The Most Reverend
- Spoken style: Your Excellency
- Religious style: Archbishop

Renzo Fratini (born 25 April 1944) is an Italian prelate of the Roman Catholic Church and diplomat of the Holy See. He became an apostolic nuncio in 1998 and ended his career as nuncio to Spain. As he resigned in 2019, the Holy See distanced itself from his criticism of the Spanish government's plans to relocate the remains of Francisco Franco.

== Biography ==
Renzo Fratini was born on 25 April 1944, in Urbisaglia, Italy, and was ordained priest on 6 September 1969 for the Diocese of Macerata-Tolentino. In 1970, he entered the Pontifical Ecclesiastical Academy to prepare for a career as a diplomat.

== Diplomatic career ==
He entered the diplomatic service of the Holy See in 1974 and served in the Pontifical diplomatic missions in France, Japan, Nigeria, Ethiopia, Greece, Ecuador, Israel and the Palestinian Territories.

On 7 August 1993, he was appointed Titular Archbishop of Botriana and Apostolic Pro-Nuncio to Pakistan. He was consecrated bishop on 2 October 1993. Cardinal Angelo Sodano was the principal consecrator and Bishops Crescenzio Sepe and Tarcisio Carboni were co-consecrators.

Pope John Paul II appointed Fratini Nuncio to Indonesia on 8 August 1998 and added the post of Nuncio to East Timor on 24 June 2003. He was transferred to Nuncio to Nigeria on 27 January 2004.

On 20 August 2009, he was named Nuncio to Spain and Andorra. He was also given the responsibilities of the Holy See's Permanent Observer to the World Tourism Organization. An unidentified archbishop said his posting in Madrid was "an irrelevant decade" in which he had no influence on church affairs and never felt comfortable with the political environment. Initially, Cardinal Antonio María Rouco Varela did not need a nuncio to communicate with the Vatican and the election of Pope Francis, who has his own Spanish contacts, ended any influence he might have had.

On 4 July 2019, Pope Francis accepted his resignation from his diplomatic positions. On 30 June 2019, shortly before that formal retirement, Fratini had criticized the Spanish government's plans to exhume and reinter the remains of Spanish dictator Francisco Franco in a less prominent place, and the Holy See Press Office had disassociated the Vatican from his remarks and said Fratini spoke "in a personal capacity" and "on the occasion of [his] definitive departure from Spain, on the conclusion of his mandate". The Spanish government had issued a formal protest that characterized Fratini's remarks as interference in Spanish domestic affairs.

== See also ==
- List of heads of the diplomatic missions of the Holy See

Catholic Church titles
Preceded by Jean-Baptiste Musty	Titular Archbishop of Botriana; 7 August 1993 – present	Succeeded by Incumbent
Diplomatic posts
Preceded by Luigi Bressan	Apostolic Nuncio to Pakistan; 7 August 1993 – 8 August 1998	Succeeded by Alessandro D'Errico
Preceded by Pietro Sambi	Apostolic Nuncio to Indonesia; 8 August 1998 – 27 January 2004	Succeeded by Malcolm Ranjith
Preceded by New title	Apostolic Nuncio to East Timor; 24 June 2003 – 27 January 2004	Succeeded by Malcolm Ranjith
Preceded by Osvaldo Padilla	Apostolic Nuncio to Nigeria; 27 January 2004 – 20 August 2009	Succeeded by Augustine Kasujja
Preceded by Manuel Monteiro de Castro	Apostolic Nuncio to Spain; 20 August 2009 – 4 July 2019	Succeeded by Bernardito Auza
Preceded by Manuel Monteiro de Castro	Apostolic Nuncio to Andorra; 20 August 2009 – 4 July 2019	Succeeded by Bernardito Auza
Preceded by Manuel Monteiro de Castro	Permanent Observer to the World Tourism Organization; 20 August 2009 – 4 July 2019	Succeeded by Maurizio Bravi
