= Georges-Marie de Jonghe d'Ardoye =

Belgian priest (1887–1961)

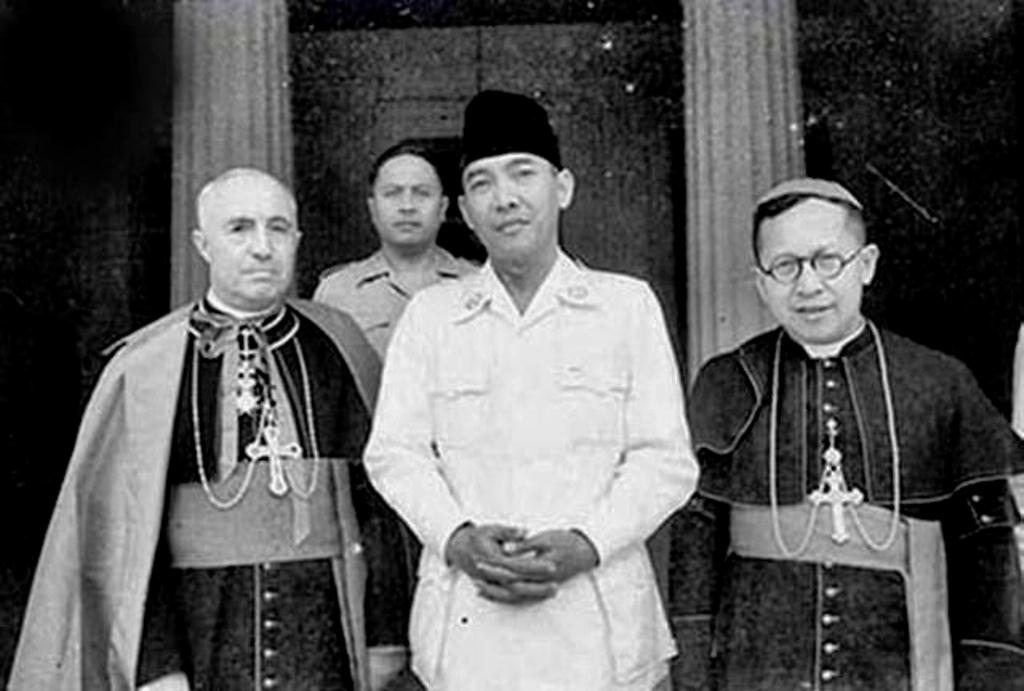
Georges-Marie de Jonghe d'Ardoye (left) with Indonesian President Sukarno and Jesuit bishop Albertus Soegijapranata, c. 1947.

Georges-Marie de Jonghe d'Ardoye, MEP (23 April 1887 – 27 August 1961) was a Belgian prelate of the Catholic Church who worked as a missionary in China and then held several posts in the diplomatic service of the Holy See.

== Biography ==
De Jonghe d'Ardoye was born on 23 April 1887 in Saint-Gilles-lès-Bruxelles, Belgium. He studied at the Collège St Michel in Brussels and Notre Dame de la Paix in Namur. He joined the Paris Foreign Missions Society on 13 September 1905. He was ordained a priest of the Missions Society on 21 June 1910 by Cardinal Désiré-Joseph Mercier. On 30 November 1910 he left France to begin his career as a missionary in Sichuan, China. He was sent first to Moutchang then to Kunglai. From 1919 to 1923, he built a large complex known as the College of Wisdom including a higher primary school, a secondary school and a Catholic normal school.

On 23 May 1933, Pope Pius XI named him titular bishop of Amathus in Cypro and Apostolic Vicar of Yünnanfu. He received his episcopal consecration on 17 September 1933 from Bishop Jean-Baptiste-Marie Budes de Guébriant, Superior General of the Foreign Missions Society.

On 17 October 1938, Pope Pius appointed him Apostolic Delegate to Iraq and titular archbishop of Misthia.

On 6 July 1947, Pope Pius XII appointed him Apostolic Delegate to Indonesia, the first papal representative there. He became Apostolic Internuncio there on 16 March 1950. His tenure there was marked by disputes with both government authorities and factions within the Church.

On 2 March 1955, Pope Pius appointed him Apostolic Internuncio to Egypt.

He resigned in 1956 for health reasons, and on 1 February 1957 was named a consultor to the Congregation for Oriental Churches.

De Jonghe d'Ardoye died in Brussels on 27 August 1961 at the age of 74.

== See also ==
- Catholic Church in Sichuan
