= Roman Catholic Diocese of Ulcinj =

Roman Catholic titular see in Montenegro

The Diocese of Ulcinj (Latin Ulcinium, Italian Dulcigno) was a Catholic bishopric with see at Ulcinj, in Montenegro, which existed from circa 800 until 1532 and was revived as Latin titular see.

It was established circa 800 as Diocese of Ulcinj without any direct precursor, although its territory was formerly under the Ancient Metropolitan Archdiocese of Doclea.

In 1532, Pope Clement VII appointed James Dalmas as bishop of Ulcinj. Dalmas was also a bishop of Budva, and the diocese was effectively merged into the Roman Catholic Diocese of Budua.

== Sources and external links ==
- GCatholic, with Google satellite photo
