= Nicholas Fernando =

Sri Lankan bishop (1932–2020)

Nicholas Marcus Fernando
- Archbishop of Colombo
- Church: Catholic Church
- Archdiocese: Archdiocese of Colombo
- In office: 21 March 1977 – 6 July 2002
- Predecessor: Thomas Cooray
- Successor: Oswald Gomis

Orders
- Ordination: 20 December 1959 by Gregorio Pietro Agagianian
- Consecration: 14 May 1977 by Thomas Cooray

Personal details
- Born: 6 December 1932 Munnakkara, Negombo, Western Province, Island of Ceylon and its Dependencies, British Empire
- Died: 10 April 2020 (aged 87) Colombo, Sri Lanka

Nicholas Marcus Fernando (6 December 1932 – 10 April 2020) was a Sri Lankan Roman Catholic archbishop.

Fernando was born in Negombo Sri Lanka and was ordained to the priesthood in 1959. He served as archbishop of the Roman Catholic Archdiocese of Colombo, Sri Lanka, from 1977 until 2002.
