= Giovanni Giarola =

Italian painter

Giovanni Giarola or Gerolli (1518–1557) was an Italian painter of the Renaissance style, active mainly in Reggio Emilia.

He was born in the frazione of Fosdondo of Correggio, Emilia-Romagna. He is said to have trained under Antonio Allegri in Correggio. By 1544, he was married and living in Reggio Emilia. He painted for four chapels in the church of San Prospero in that city. He frescoed the facade of the palace of Conti Malaguzzi da San Tommaso. He died in Reggio.
