= Doclea (Illyria) =

Archaeologic site in Montenegro

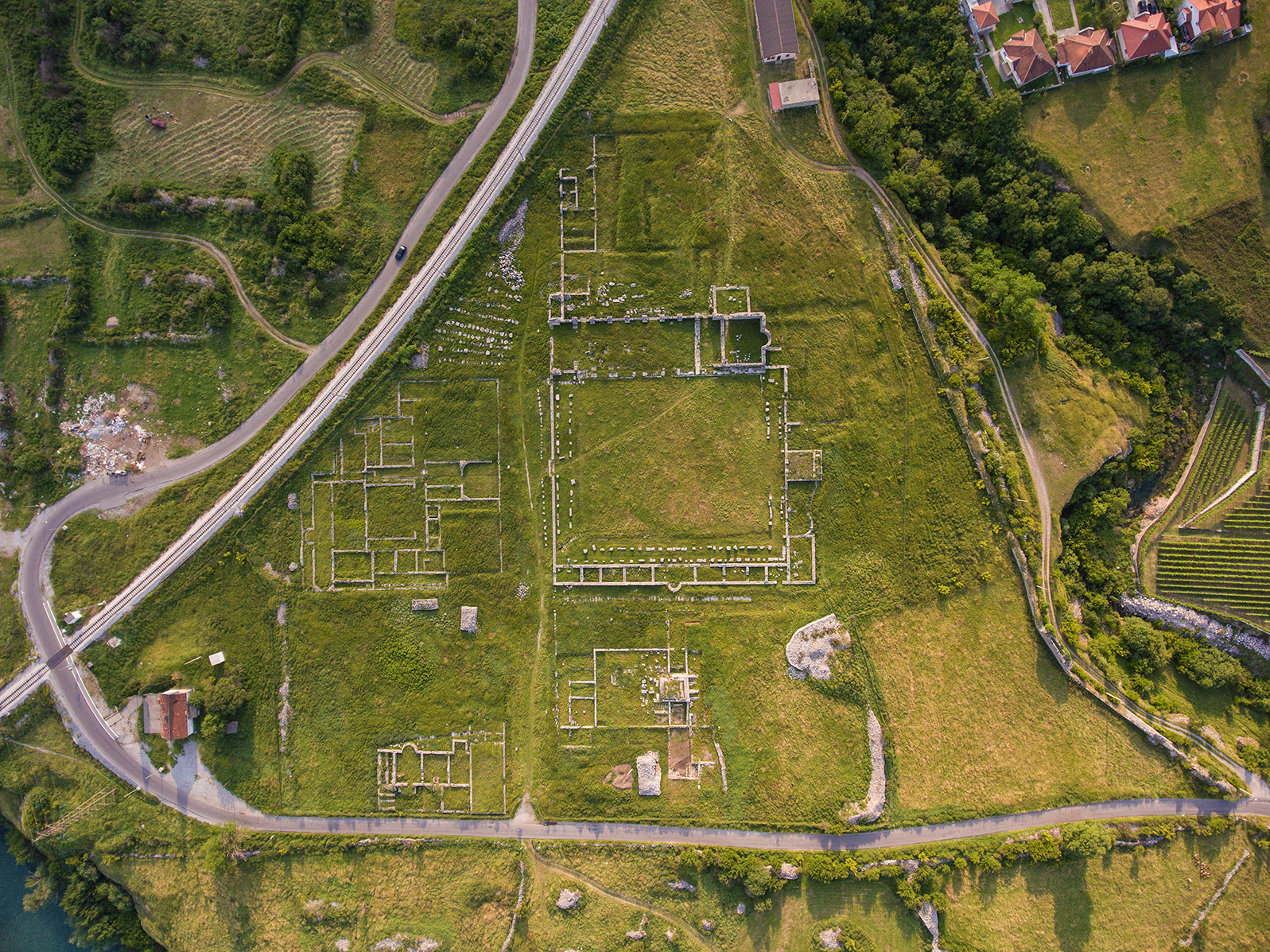
- Aerial view of the ancient city site in Doclea

- Location within Montenegro
- 42°28′6″N 19°15′55″E
- Type: Settlement
- Periods: Classical, Roman
- Cultures: Illyrian, Roman
- Location: Podgorica, Montenegro
- Region: Illyria, Dalmatia, Praevalitana

Site notes
- Owner: Public

Doclea or Dioclea, also known as Diokleia or Diocleia (Montenegrin: Дукља / Duklja; Greek: Διοκλεία, romanized: Diokleía), was an ancient Illyrian, Roman and Byzantine city, in the region of the Docleatae tribe (Roman province of Dalmatia, later Praevalitana), now an archeological site near Podgorica in modern Montenegro.

It was an episcopal see from the late Roman period through the Early Middle Ages. Today, it is a titular see, both in the Eastern Orthodox Church, and in the Catholic Church (Latin Rite).

When spelled as Diocleia or Diokleia, it should not be confused with ancient Phrygian city of Diokleia in Phrygia (Greek: Διόκλεια Φρυγίας).

== History ==
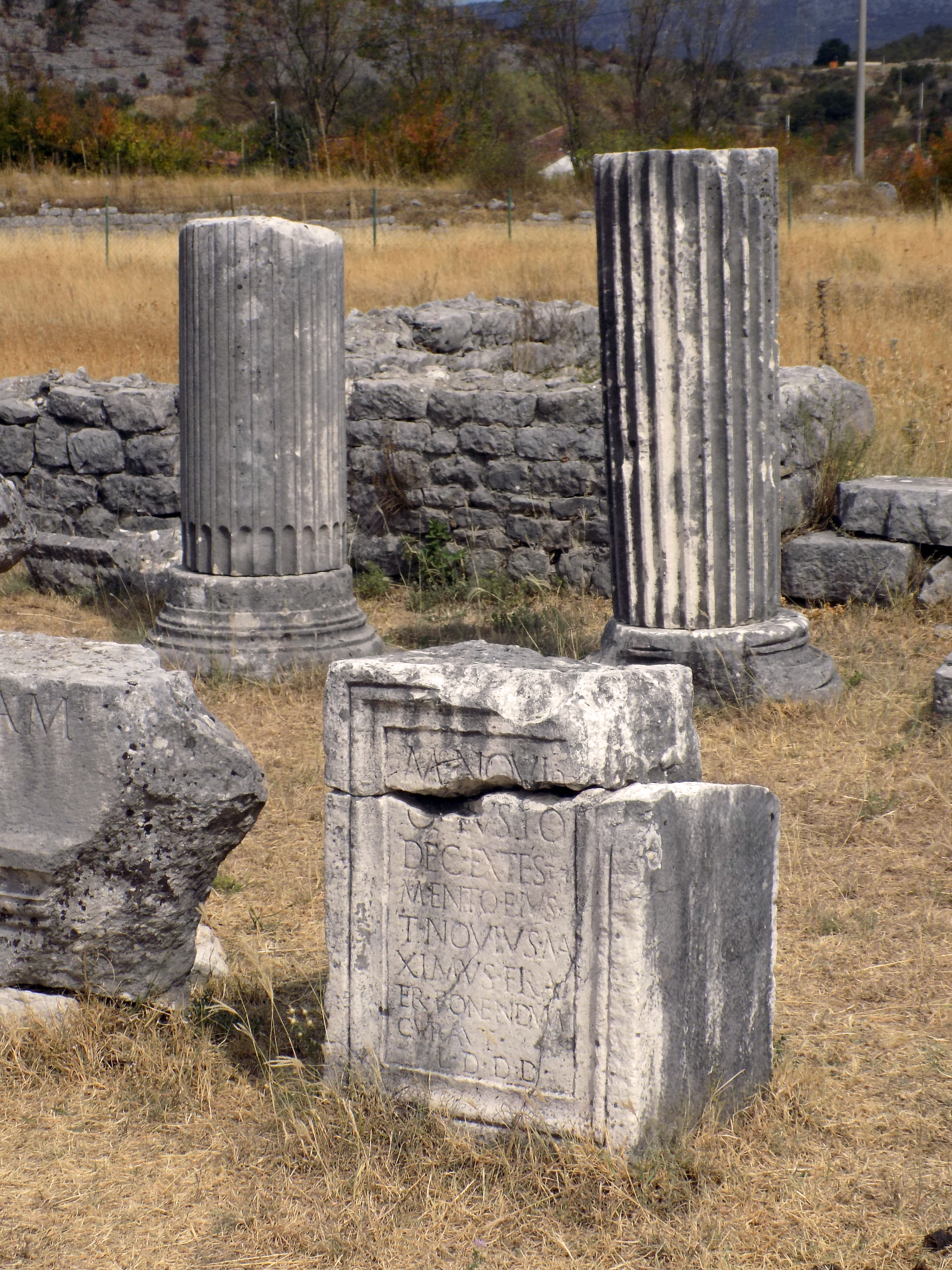
Archeological remains of the Roman period in Doclea

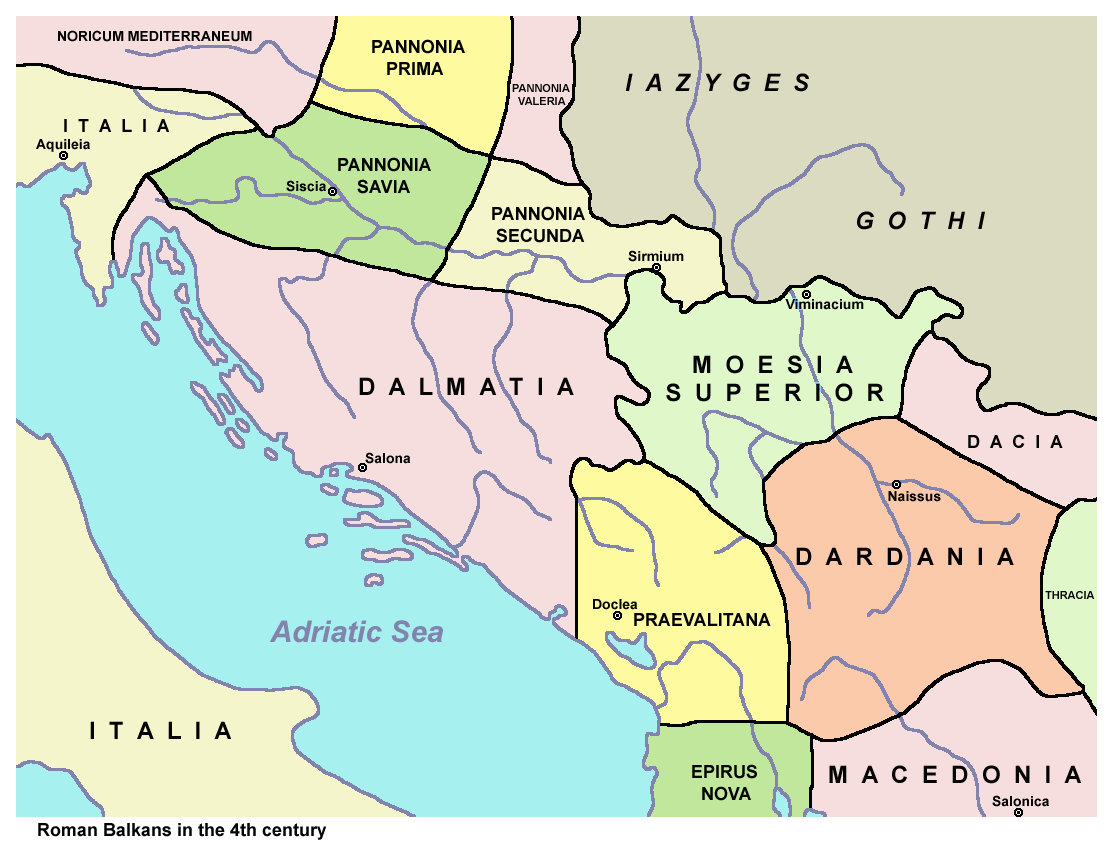
The city of Doclea in the late Roman province of Praevalitana

The town was situated ca. 3 km north from present-day Podgorica, Montenegro's capital. The Illyrian Docleatae, which were later Romanized, inhabiting the area derived their name from the city. Doclea was the largest settlement of the Docleatae, and became a municipality during the reign of Emperor Claudius, thus between year 41 and 54 AD. A large town with between 8,000 and 10,000 inhabitants, Doclea had been built to conform to the terrain. The surrounding area had a relatively high population density within a radius of 10 km due to the city's geographical position, a favorable climate, positive economic conditions and defensive site that were of great importance at that time.

Pliny the Elder mentions the cheese of Doclea as a famous Illyrian product.

After the administrative division of the Roman Empire in 297, Doclea became the capital of the new Roman province of Praevalitana, which Roman emperor Diocletian established in the imperial administrative reform of 293, splitting this southern part from the province of Dalmatia. The castle of Doclea was built as a typical Roman castrum with the purpose of controlling the road coming from Dalmatia and going to Scodra.

In the 4th and the 5th centuries, it was taken by the barbarian tribes and went into decline. At the beginning of the 5th century, it was attacked by the Germanic Visigoths. A severe earthquake destroyed it in 518. The South Slavs migrated into the land and proceeded to rebuild the settlement in the 7th century. The historical ruins of the town can be seen today.

== Ecclesiastical history ==
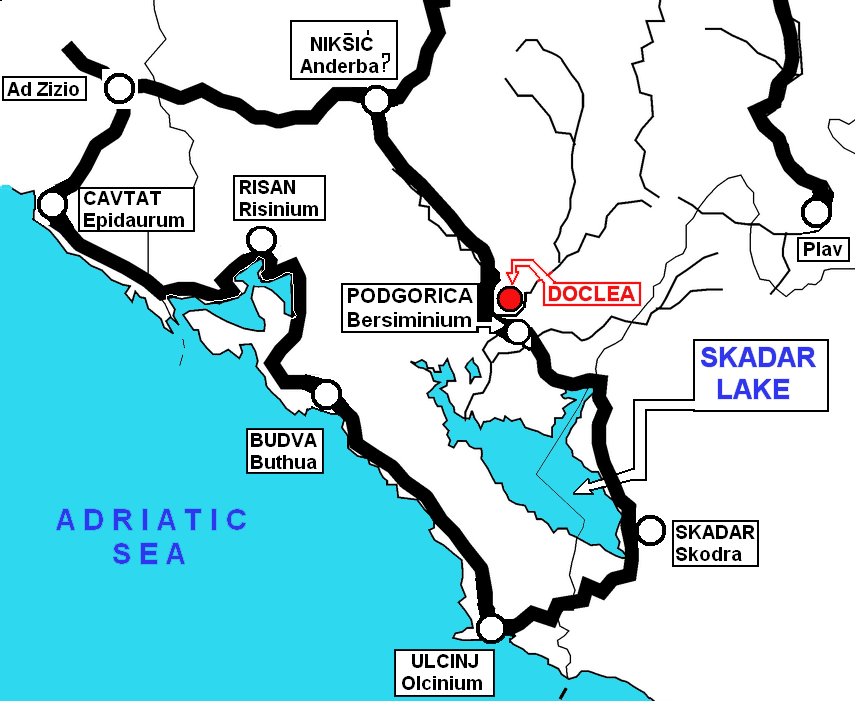
Location of the ancient city of Doclea

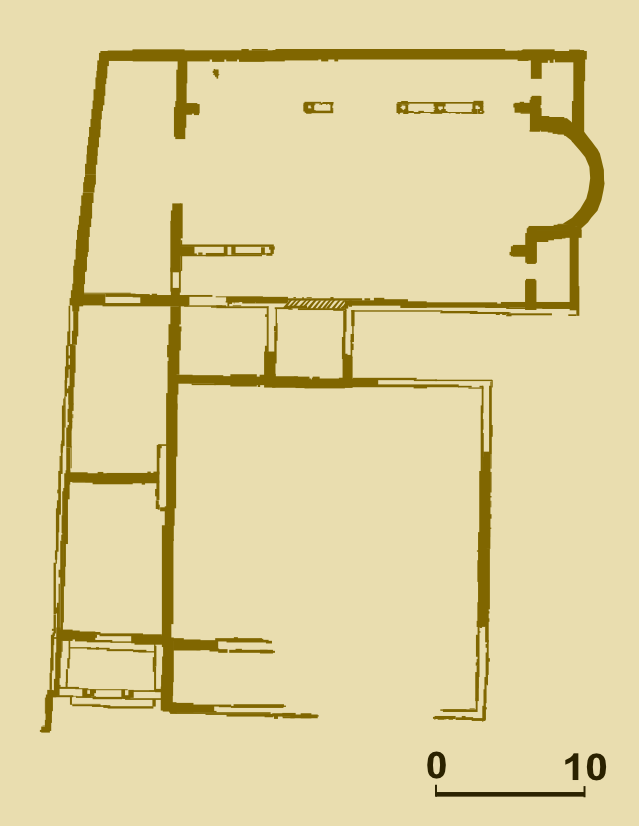
Old Christian "Basilica A" in Doclea, discovered in late 19th century by the English team led by John Arthur Ruskin Munro

Circa 400, the city became the seat of a bishopric, initially as suffragan of the Archdiocese of Salona. A letter from Pope Gregory I to bishop Constanti(n?)us (circa 602) suggests it had become suffragan of the Archdiocese of Scutari.

- Around 877, the synod of Dumno (Delmitanus), elevatated it;, apparently justified as former capital of a Late Roman province Dalmatia Superior, to Metropolitan rank in chief of a Bulgarian ecclesiastical province at the expense of Scutari, but shifting Bulgarian borders made it lose the Metropolitan status again the next century
- The Byzantine Notitia Episcopatuum in the tenth century. lists it fifth among the suffragans of the Metropolitanate of Dyrrachium, in the sway of the Ecumenical Patriarchate of Constantinople.
- It was suppressed in 927, when the city was destroyed and its last bishop John took refuge in Ragusa, of which he was soon named Archbishop.
- Allegedly from 1034 (no later than the 1062 letter from Pope Alexander II (1061–1073) to their Archbishop Peter) till circa 1100, its now hollow title was nominally united in personal union with the neighbouring, then still Archdiocese of Bar (Antivari), also in modern Montenegro, possibly mainly to justify its (later lost) Metropolitan status.

Few of its bishops are historically documented, and some sources may confound the see with Diocletiana.

- Paulus (circa 590)
- Nemesius (in 602)
- (Anonymus) (circa 877)
- Johannes = John (circa 900)

=== Serbian Orthodox titular see ===
Auxiliary bishops of the Metropolitanate of Montenegro and the Littoral (Serbian Orthodox Church) are given the title "Bishop of Dioclea" (Serbian: епископ диоклијски). Recent holders of the title were bishops Jovan Purić (2004–2011), Kirilo Bojović (2016–2018), Metodije Ostojić (2018–2021) and Pajsije Đerković (since 2024).

=== Roman Catholic titular see ===
In 1910, the archdiocese was nominally restored as Latin titular archbishopric of the Metropolitan (highest) rank as Dioclea, renamed from 1925 (exclusively from 1933) as Doclea.

It has had the following archiepiscopal incumbents :

- Carlo Bertuzzi (Italian) (1910.05.10 – death 1914.01.04), emeritate as former Bishop of Rieti (Italy) (1889.02.11 – 1895.03.18) and Bishop of Foligno (Italy) (1895.03.18 – retired 1910.05.10)
- Henri Doulcet (French), Passionists (C.P.) (1914.03.17 – death 1916.07.27) on emeritates, formerly Bishop of Nikopol (Bulgaria) (1895.01.07 – retired 1913.03.31) and Titular Bishop of Ionopolis (1913.06.03 – resigned 1914.03.17)
- Pietro Fumasoni Biondi (1916.11.14 – 1933.03.13) (Italian) as papal diplomat and Roman Curia official : Apostolic Delegate to East India (1916.11.15 – 1919.12.06), Apostolic Delegate to Japan (1919.12.06 – 1921.06.16), Secretary of Sacred Congregation of the Propagation of the Faith (1921.06.14 – 1922.12.14), Apostolic Delegate to United States of America (1922.12.14 – 1933.03.13), created Cardinal-Priest of S. Croce in Gerusalemme (1933.03.16 – death 1960.07.12), Prefect of above Sacred Congregation of the Propagation of the Faith (1933.03.16 – 1960.07.12)
- Paolo Marella (1933.09.15 – 1959.12.14) (Italian) as papal diplomat and Roman Curia official : Apostolic Delegate to Japan (1933.10.30 – 1948.10.27), Apostolic Delegate to Australia, New Zealand and Oceania (1948.10.27 – 1953.04.15), Apostolic Nuncio (papal ambassador) to France (1953.04.15 – 1959.12.14), Apostolic Pro-Nuncio to France (1959.12.14 – 1960.04.16), created Cardinal-Priest of S. Andrea delle Fratte (1960.03.31 – 1972.03.15), President of Sacred Congregation of the Reverend Basilica of St. Peter (1961.08.14 – 1967), Archpriest of Papal Basilica of St. Peter (1961.08.14 – 1983.02.08), President of Secretariat for Non-Christians (1964.05.19 – 1973.02.26), President of Reverend Fabric of St. Peter (1967 – 1983.02.08), promoted Cardinal-Bishop of Porto e Santa Rufina (1972.03.15 – death 1984.10.15), Cardinal Vice-Dean of College of Cardinals (1977.12.12 – 1984.10.15)
- Egano Righi-Lambertini (Italian) (1960.07.09 – 1979.06.30), papal diplomat : Apostolic Delegate to Korea (1957.12.28 – 1960.07.09), Apostolic Nuncio to Lebanon (1960.07.09 – 1963.12.09), Apostolic Nuncio to Chile (1963.12.09 – 1967.07.08), Apostolic Nuncio to Italy (1967.07.08 – 1969.04.23), Apostolic Nuncio to France (1969.04.23 – 1979.06.30), created Cardinal-Deacon of S. Giovanni Bosco in Via Tuscolana (1979.06.30 – 1990.11.26), promoted Cardinal-Priest of S. Maria in Via (1990.11.26 – death 2000.10.04)
- Jozef Tomko (1979.07.12 – 1985.05.25) (Slovakia), Roman Curia official : Adjunct Secretary of International Theological Commission (1969 – 1971), Undersecretary of Sacred Congregation for Bishops (1974 – 1979.07.12), Secretary General of Synod of Bishops (1979.07.12 – 1985.04.24), Pro-Prefect of Congregation for the Propagation of the Faith (1985.04.24 – 1985.05.27), created Cardinal-Deacon of Gesù Buon Pastore alla Montagnola (1985.05.25 – 1996.01.29), Prefect of above Congregation for the Evangelization of Peoples (1985.05.27 – 2001.04.09), President of Interdicasterial Commission for Consecrated Religious (1989.03.18 – 2001.04.09), promoted Cardinal-Priest of S. Sabina (1996.01.29 – ?death ...), President of Pontifical Committee for International Eucharistic Congresses (2001.10.23 – 2007.10.01), Member of Commission of Cardinals overseeing the Institute for Works of Religion (2002.01.08 – 2008.02.24)
- Pier Luigi Celata (1985.12.12 – present)

== See also ==
- History of Montenegro
- Docleatae
- Doracium
- List of Catholic dioceses in Montenegro
- List of ancient cities in Illyria

== Sources ==
- Stevović, Ivan (2016). "Early Byzantine Doclea and its citizens: Longe ab patriam" (PDF). Niš and Byzantium. 14: 121–136.
- Koprivica T. Sacral Topography of Late Antique and Early Christian Doclea (Montenegro): the First Modern Preliminary Investigation. //Актуальные проблемы теории и истории искусства: сб. науч. статей. Вып. 2 . Под ред. А.В.Захаровой— Санкт-Петербург: НП-Принт — 2012. — с.314-320 ISBN 978-5-91542-185-0
- Michel Lequien, Oriens christianus in quatuor Patriarchatus digestus, Paris 1740, vol. II, coll. 277-282 & Index, p. III
- Daniele Farlati-Jacopo Coleti, Illyricum Sacrum, vol. VII, Venice 1817, pp. 1–7
- Wilkes, John J. (2017). "Places: 481808 (Doclea)". Pleiades.
