= Thebaid (disambiguation) =

The Thebaid, or Thebais, was a region of ancient Egypt.

Thebaid or Thebais may also refer to:

- Thebais (Greece) or Thebaid, a region of ancient Boeotia, containing the city of Thebes
- Thebaid (Greek poem) or Thebais, an Ancient Greek epic poem telling the story of the war between Eteocles and Polynices
- Thebaid (Latin poem) or Thebais, an epic poem by the Roman poet Statius on the same subject
- Thebaid or Thebais, an epic poem by Antimachus
- The Thebaid (painting), a c. 1460 painting by Paolo Uccello
- La Thébaïde, a 1664 play by Jean Racine
