= Santi Valentino e Teresa, Matelica =

Roman Catholic church

Santi Valentino e Teresa is a Baroque-style, Roman Catholic church and monastery located on Via Sant’Adriano in the city center of Matelica, province of Macerata, region of Marche, Italy.

== History ==
The present church was completed in 1713 designed by Giovanni Battista Bartoli. The church was erected by the Carmelite order, and remained so until the Napoleonic suppression. During the 19th century, it was assigned first to the Oratory of Saint Philip Neri, then the Silvestrine order. The façade is simple, made of brick. The layout of the church is that of a Greek Cross. The main altarpiece depicts a Madonna and Child with Saints Valentine and Teresa by an unknown artists inserted into a baroque frame.
