= John dal Bastone =

Blessed John dal Bastone

Monk
- Born: 24 March 1200; Paterno, Fabriano, Ancona, Papal States
- Died: 24 March 1290 (aged 90); Fabriano, Ancona, Papal States
- Venerated in: Roman Catholic Church
- Beatified: 29 August 1772, Saint Peter's Basilica, Papal States by Pope Clement XIV
- Major shrine: Church of St John dal Bastone, Pelawatte, Sri Lanka.
- Feast: 24 March

Blessed John dal Bastone or Bl. John of the Staff, born Giovanni Bonello Botegoni (24 March 1200 – 24 March 1290), is a Blessed of the Roman Catholic Church.

== Biography ==
John was born in Paterno, Fabriano, Italy. His father Bonello and mother Superla had five children and John was the youngest. Because of his studious nature, his parents sent him to Bologna to study the humanities. He was afflicted with a purulent sore on one side of his thigh. Journeying back home, he rode on the back of a donkey, which made his thigh weaker. He was lame for the rest of his life and was forced to walk with the help of a staff, for this he was nicknamed John ‘of the staff’ (dal Bastone). Attracted by the fame of the sanctity of the venerable Sylvester Gozzolini (Italian: Silvestro Guzzolini) John went to meet him. He was received into the holy order and took up a monastic way of life, about 1230. He lived for 60 years in a small cell of the Hermitage of Montefano Renowned for its love of concealment, for prudence and counsel.

Silvester then promoted him into the priesthood. John's body was racked with pain, but he nevertheless observed the greatest poverty and had no possessions beyond his needs and without permission from his spiritual father. His fellow monks confidently sought his advice in their difficulties and doubts. He continued to preach even after the death of Sylvester in 1267. Later, his sore became worse and he was taken for treatment to Fabriano, where he died. His body was laid in the church of St. Benedict in Fabriano.

On 29 August 1772, he was beatified. On 27 October 1872, in the centenary year of his being raised to the status of Blessed, the foundation stone was laid for a church in his name at Pelawatte, Battaramulla, Sri Lanka. The church was completed in 1881. The church was originally administered by the Silvestrines but in 1972 it was entrusted to the Franciscans.

In 2006, the Sri Lanka Post issued a stamp commemorating the 125th anniversary of the church, which is the only one in the world to be dedicated to St John dal Bastone.
