= San Giorgio alla Costa =

Church in Florence, Italy

Coordinates: 43.7653°N 11.2549°E

The church of San Giorgio alla Costa, called in earlier times also dei Santi Giorgio e Massimiliano dello Spirito Santo (of Ss. George and Maximilian of the Holy Spirit) is a small historical church in the Oltrarno district of the centre of Florence, situated on the steep slope of via Costa San Giorgio which runs uphill from Ponte Vecchio to Forte di Belvedere.

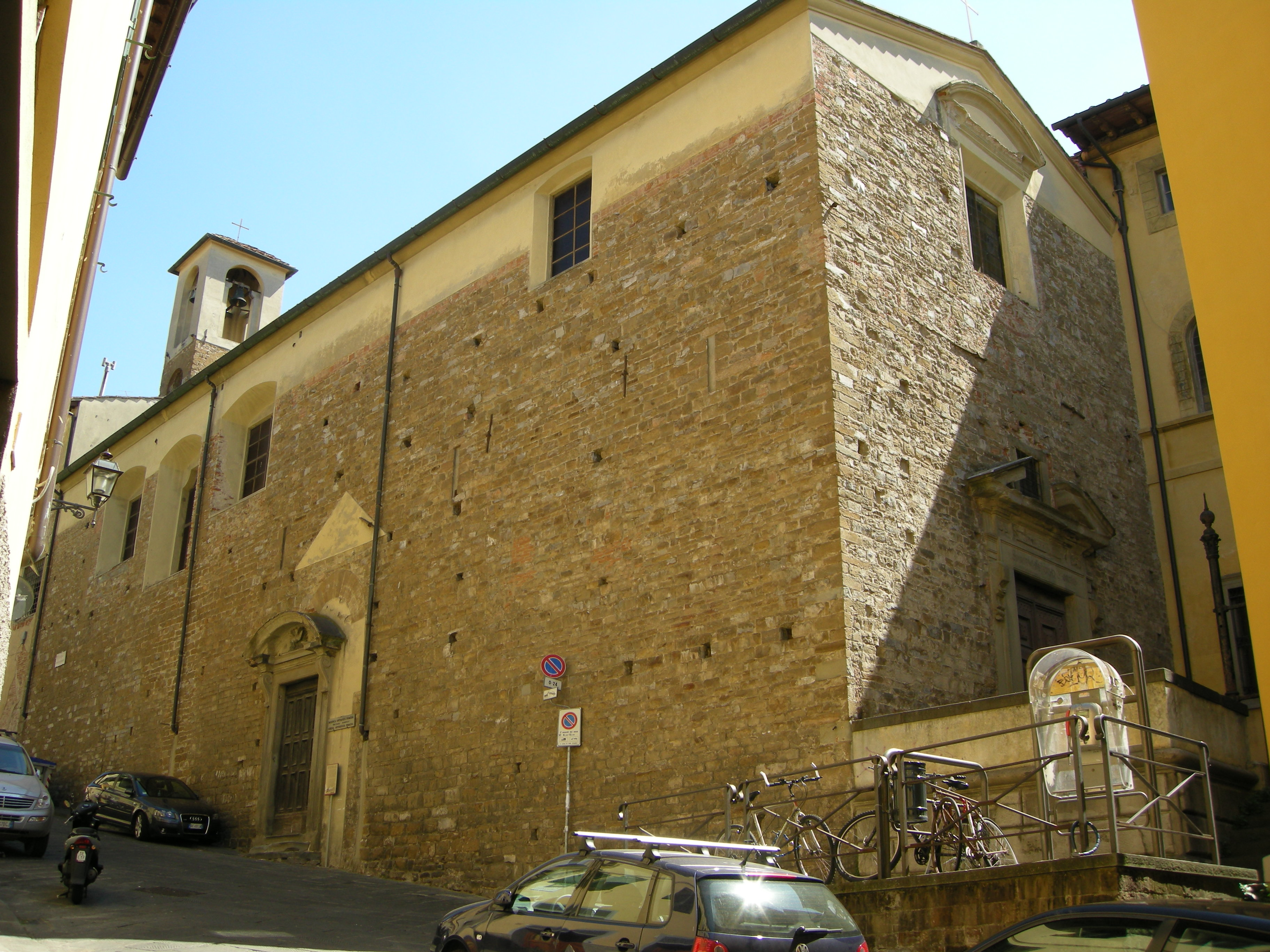
Church of San Giorgio alla Costa

== History ==
In earlier times there existed at this locality three small churches of which one was dedicated to the martyr Saint George, another to Saint Sigismund and the third to Saint Mamilian. The church of San Giorgio (St George) predated the year 1000 and was one of the main priorie (priories) of medieval Florence.

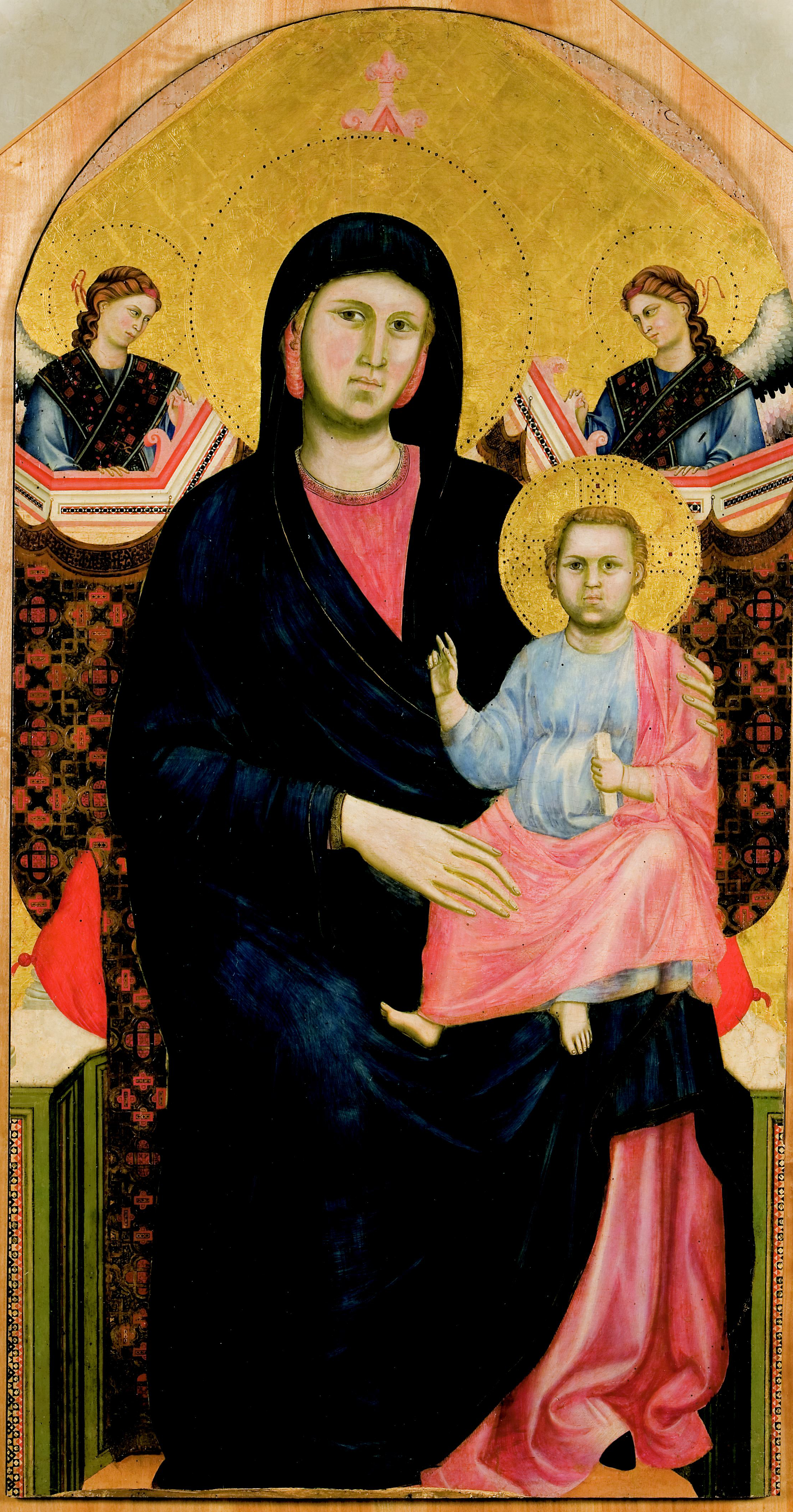
Giotto, San Giorgio alla Costa Virgin and Child

It was for this church that the young Giotto painted the altarpiece Madonna di San Giorgio alla Costa (San Giorgio alla Costa Virgin) known also as Madonna col Bambino in trono e due Angeli (Virgin enthroned with Child and two angels), formerly conserved in the Diocesan Museum at Santo Stefano al Ponte, Florence, but as of 2018 exhibited at the Museo dell'Opera del Duomo (Florence),. Not long after the completion of Giotto's commission, a convent was built on to the church, and this convent was enlarged and completely renovated in the course of the fifteenth century. The establishment belonged in turn to the Canons of Sant'Andrea a Mosciano, to the Dominicans and to the Silvestrines.

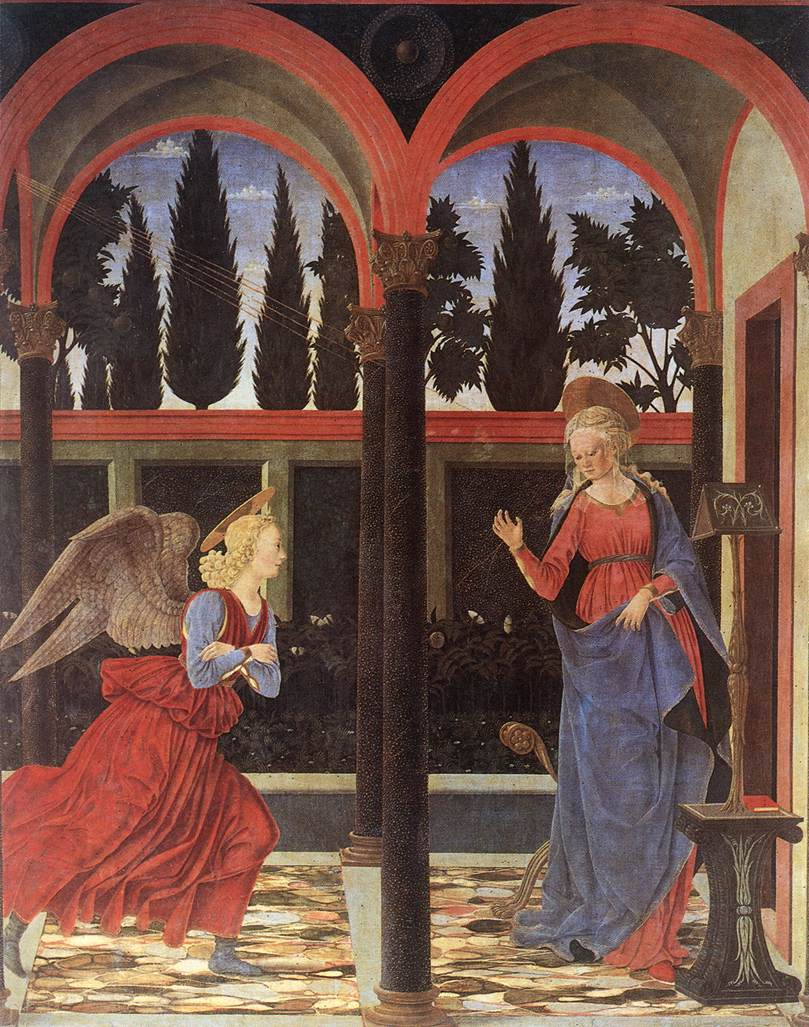
Alesso Baldovinetti, Annunciation

In the period when Silvestrines were in possession, around the year 1457 Alesso Baldovinetti was commissioned to paint in tempera on wood a depiction of the Annunciation now conserved in Florence's Uffizi Gallery. Giorgio Vasari mistaken attributed it to Pesellino. Some have seen in the painting's architectural background an allusion to the work of Michelozzo.

In 1520 at the behest of Lucrezia de' Medici, the daughter of Lorenzo il Magnifico, a new convent was dedicated to the Holy Spirit and entrusted to the Vallombrosan nuns. In 1705-1708 the church was renovated by the architect Giovanni Battista Foggini and the interior decorated with works in Rococo style by Alessandro Gherardini and Anton Domenico Gabbiani (Descent of the Holy Spirit in the oval over the high altar).

Along with many other religious establishments in the city and throughout Europe, the convent was seized by the civil authoritities during the upheavals stemming from the French Revolution and the expansion of the Napoleonic Empire, in 1808. In the years that followed, there was a period, between 1926 and 1998, when it served as the Caserma Vittorio Veneto (Vittorio Veneto Barracks), which was concerned in particular with the formation of trainee medical officers and pharmacists for the Military School of Medicine.

The church has been for some time in the hands of the Romanian Orthodox Church, though structural problems in the roof have made the church itself unusable and the congregation has been meeting in a nearby room.

== Works formerly in San Giorgio alla Costa ==
- Giotto, Madonna col Bambino di San Giorgio alla Costa, now in the Diocesan Museum at Santo Stefano al Ponte in Florence
- Alesso Baldovinetti, Annunciation, now in the Uffizi Gallery.
- Paolo Uccello, The Thebaid, now in the Galleria dell'Accademia
