= Santi Apostoli, Rome =

Catholic basilica, a landmark of Rome, Italy

Santi XII Apostoli
- Church of the Twelve Holy Apostles; SS. XII Apostolorum (in Latin)
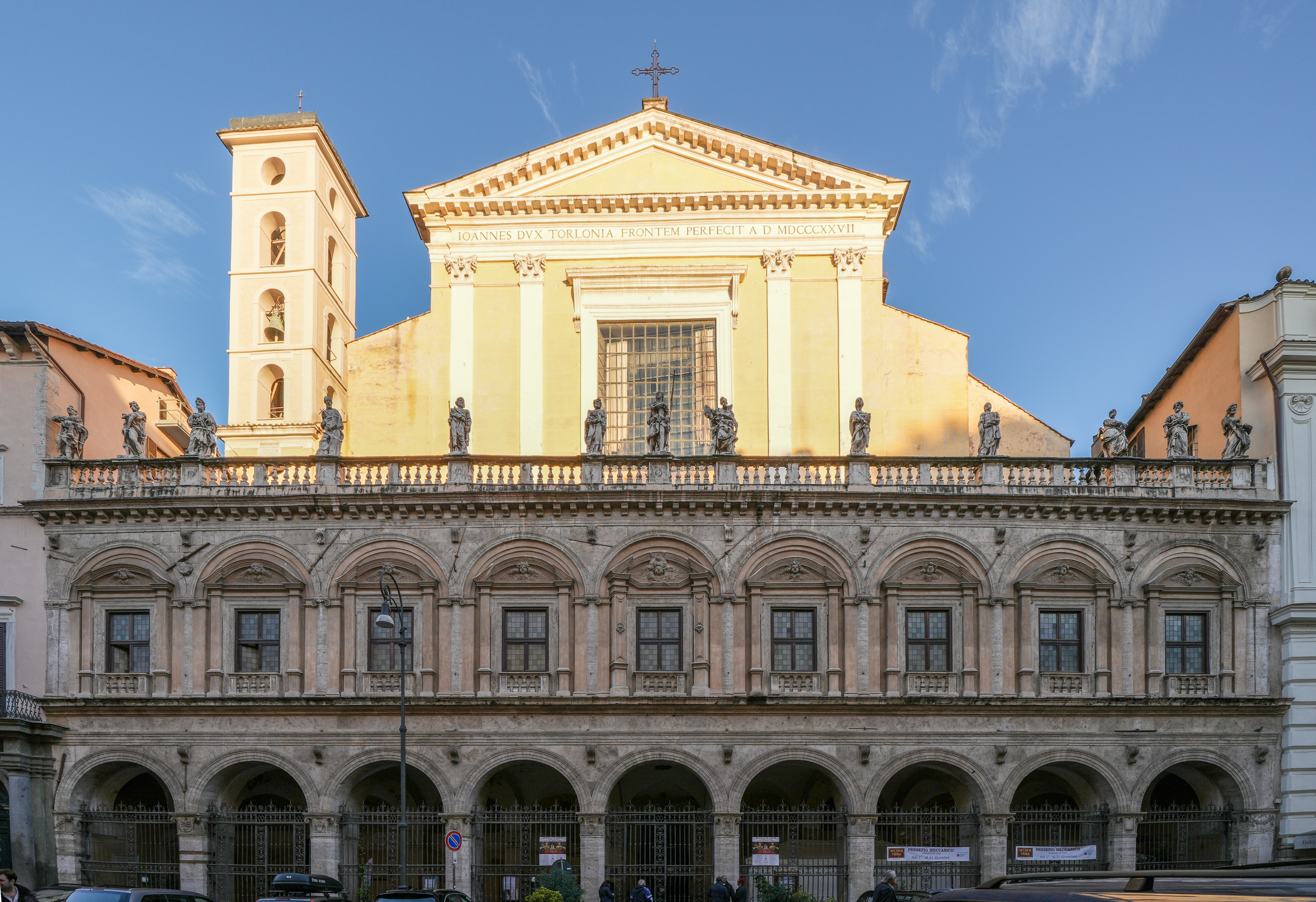
- Click on the map for a fullscreen view
- 41°53′53.18″N 12°28′59.54″E
- Location: Piazza Dei Santi Apostoli, Rome
- Country: Italy
- Denomination: Catholic Church
- Sui iuris church: Latin Church
- Religious order: Conventual Franciscans
- Website: Official website

History
- Status: Titulus minor basilica, Parish church, Conventual church of the General Motherhouse of the Order of Friars Minor Conventual
- Dedication: Twelve Apostles

Architecture
- Architect(s): Baccio Pontelli, Carlo Rainaldi, Carlo Fontana
- Architectural type: Church
- Style: Baroque
- Groundbreaking: 6th century
- Completed: 1714

Specifications
- Length: 75 metres (246 ft)
- Width: 40 metres (130 ft)

Administration
- Province: Diocese of Rome

Santi Dodici Apostoli (Church of the Twelve Holy Apostles; Latin: SS. Duodecim Apostolorum), commonly known as Santi Apostoli, is a 6th-century Catholic parish and titular church and minor basilica in Rome, Italy, the mother church of the Conventual Franciscan Order whose General Curia (world headquarters) is in the adjacent building. Dedicated originally to St. James and St. Philip, whose relics are kept here, and later to all Apostles, it is the Station church for Friday, the first week of Lent. The purported bodily material of James held at the Church was dated to AD 240–340. While the altar canal 267–539 and ceramic shard 314–746, which aligned with the timeframe of when Pope Pelagius I consecrated and moved Christian remains to the basilica.

The Cardinal Priest of the Titulus XII Apostolorum is Angelo Scola. Among the previous Cardinal Priests are Pope Clement XIV, whose tomb by Canova is in the basilica, and Henry Benedict Stuart.

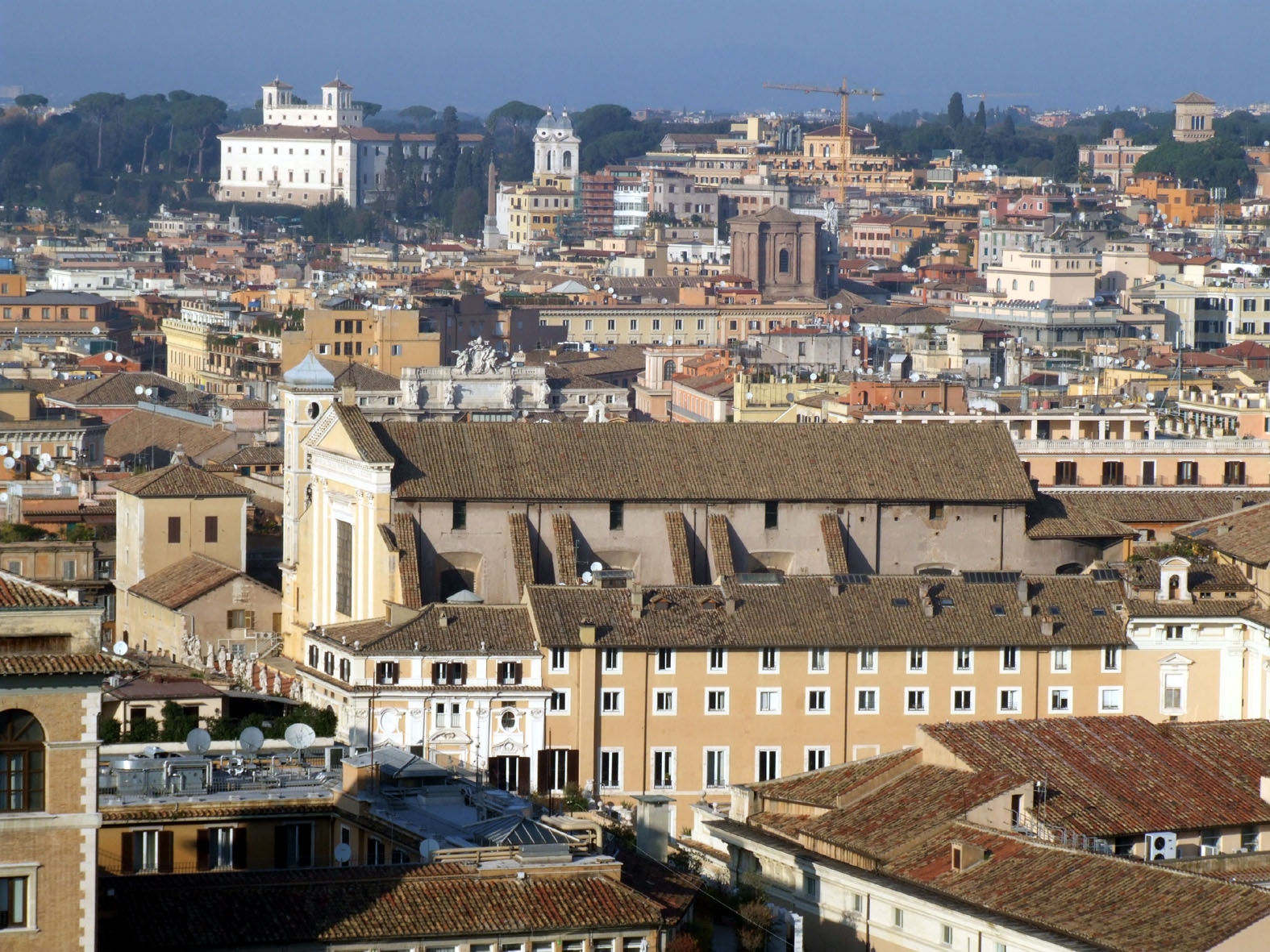
View of the church from the Vittoriano

== History ==
The first church dedicated to the Holy Apostles was one built under Pope Julius I in the mid-fourth century near Trajan's Forum. It is listed as "Titulus SS Apostolorum" in the acts of the synod of 499. Its successor was built by Pope Pelagius I, on the present site, to celebrate the victory of Narses over the Ostrogoths at the Battle of Taginae in 552. General Narses contributed to the construction of the building. It was dedicated around 570 by Pope John III to St. James and Saint Philip the Apostle. Santi Apostoli was ruined by the earthquake of 1348, and left abandoned.

In 1417, Pope Martin V, whose Colonna family owned the adjacent Palazzo Colonna, restored the church. The Franciscans took charge of the church in 1463. A more extensive restoration was undertaken by Pope Sixtus IV and his nephew, Giuliano della Rovere, from 1471 to 1484.

The inscriptions found in SS. XII Apostoli, a valuable source illustrating the history of the church, have been collected and published by Vincenzo Forcella.

== Architecture ==
The 15th-century portico that precedes the present facade is by Baccio Pontelli. In 1665, Carlo Rainaldi walled up the arches in the upper level and installed statues on the parapet. The church was later restored, with the facade completed by Giuseppe Valadier in 1827.

On the wall of the portico on the right side, there is an antique bas-relief of an eagle surrounded by an oak crown that it holds in its talons. Opposite is the monument of the Venetian engraver Giovanni Volpato sculpted and erected by his friend and countryman Antonio Canova. It consists of a large bas-relief, representing "Friendship in Mourning" in the form of a woman weeping before the bust of the deceased Volpato.

== Interior ==
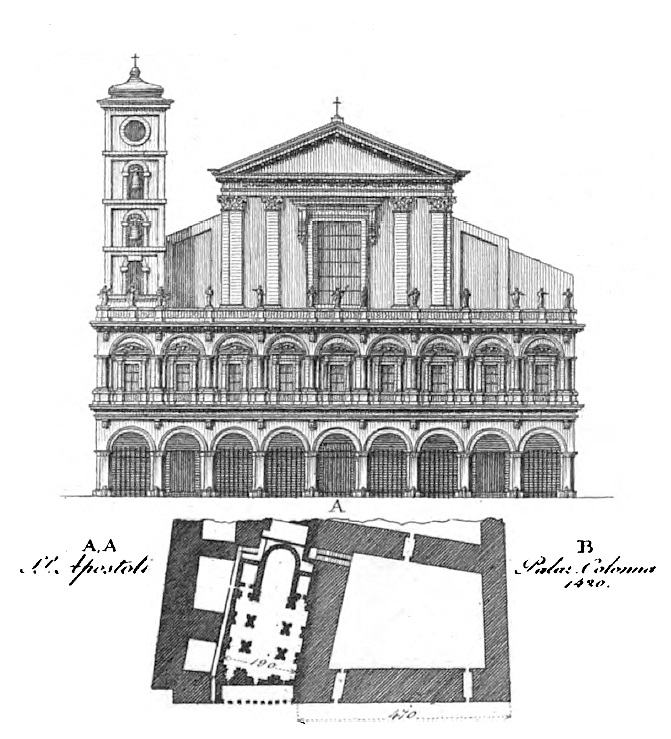
Facade of the Basilica and plan

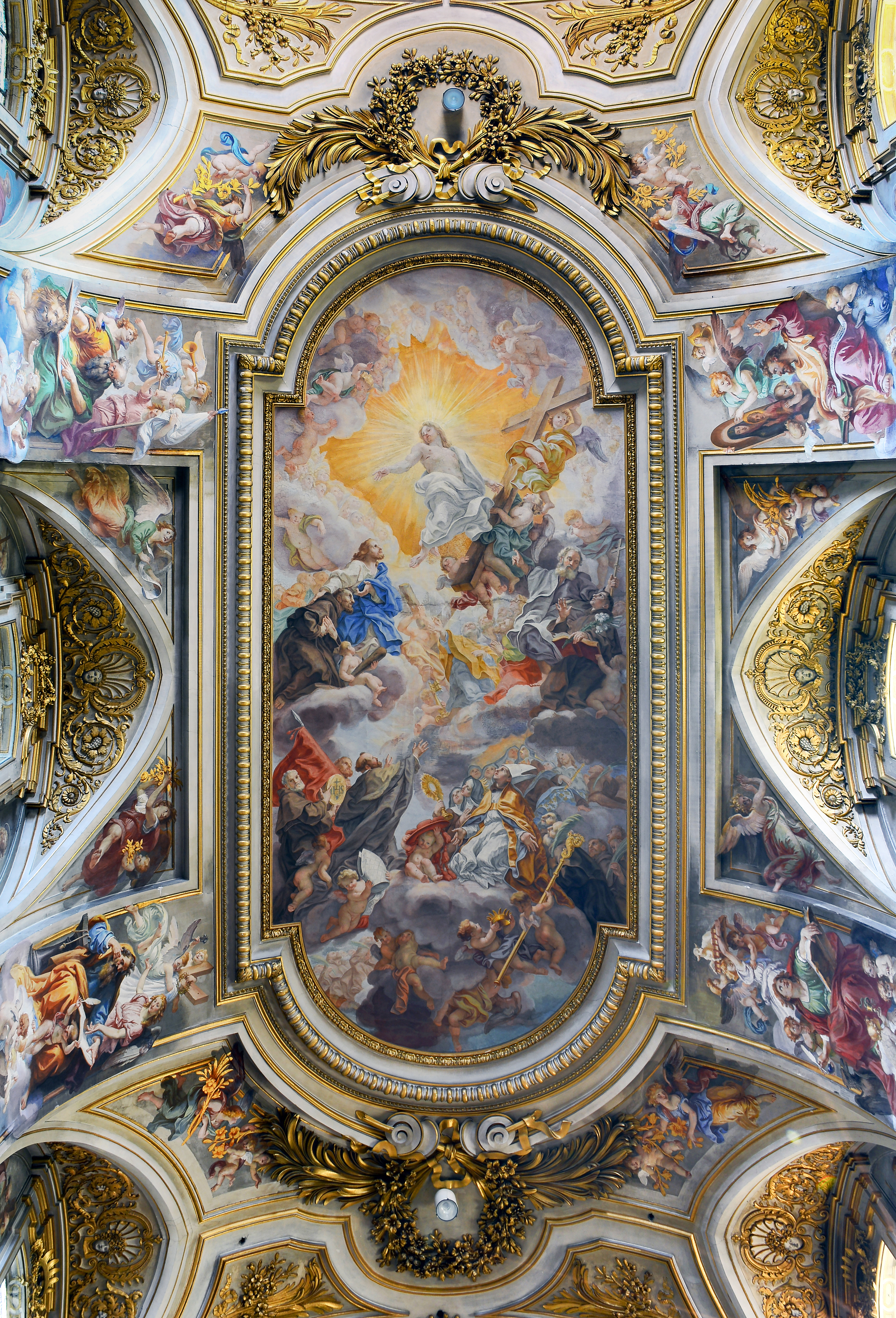
Triumph of the Franciscan Order, Baciccio

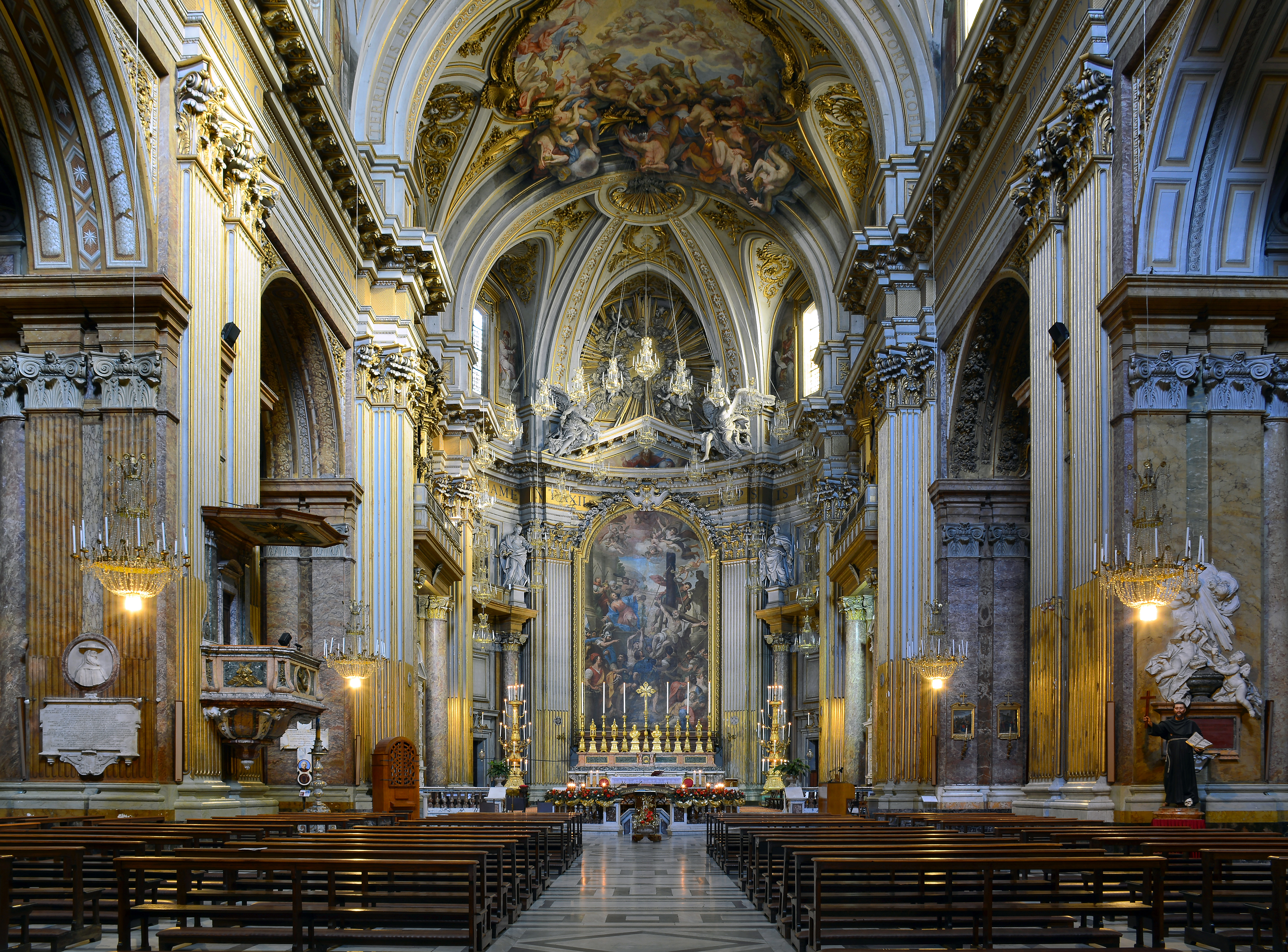
Basilica dei Santi Apostoli (Roma) - Interior

Around 1700, Pope Clement XI instigated dramatic renovations of the church. A new Baroque interior was designed by Carlo Fontana and completed in 1714. The fresco on the vaulted ceiling is the Triumph of the Franciscan Order by Baciccio. Above the sanctuary is a fresco from 1709 by Giovanni Odazzi, representing the "Fall of Lucifer and his Angels".

There are also later frescoes of the Evangelists by Luigi Fontana in the apse. The main altar had a baldacchino with four porphyry columns. The altarpiece is by Domenico Maria Muratori and depicts the Martyrdoms of the Apostles Philip and James the Less.

To the right of the high altar are the tombs of Count Giraud de Caprières (died 1505) and Cardinal Raffaele Riario (died 1521), tentatively attributed to Michelangelo. To the left is a monument to Cardinal Pietro Riario, nephew of Pope Sixtus IV, by the school of Andrea Bregno and possibly designed by Andrea Bregno himself. There is also a Madonna by Mino da Fiesole.

Next to a pier of the nave on the right-hand side, near the first chapel, is enshrined the heart of Maria Klementyna Sobieska, wife of the Old Pretender, James Francis Edward Stuart. Her tomb is in St Peter's Basilica. Her monument is by Filippo della Valle. Her husband used to pray here every morning; it was his parish church when he lived at the nearby Palazzo Muti.

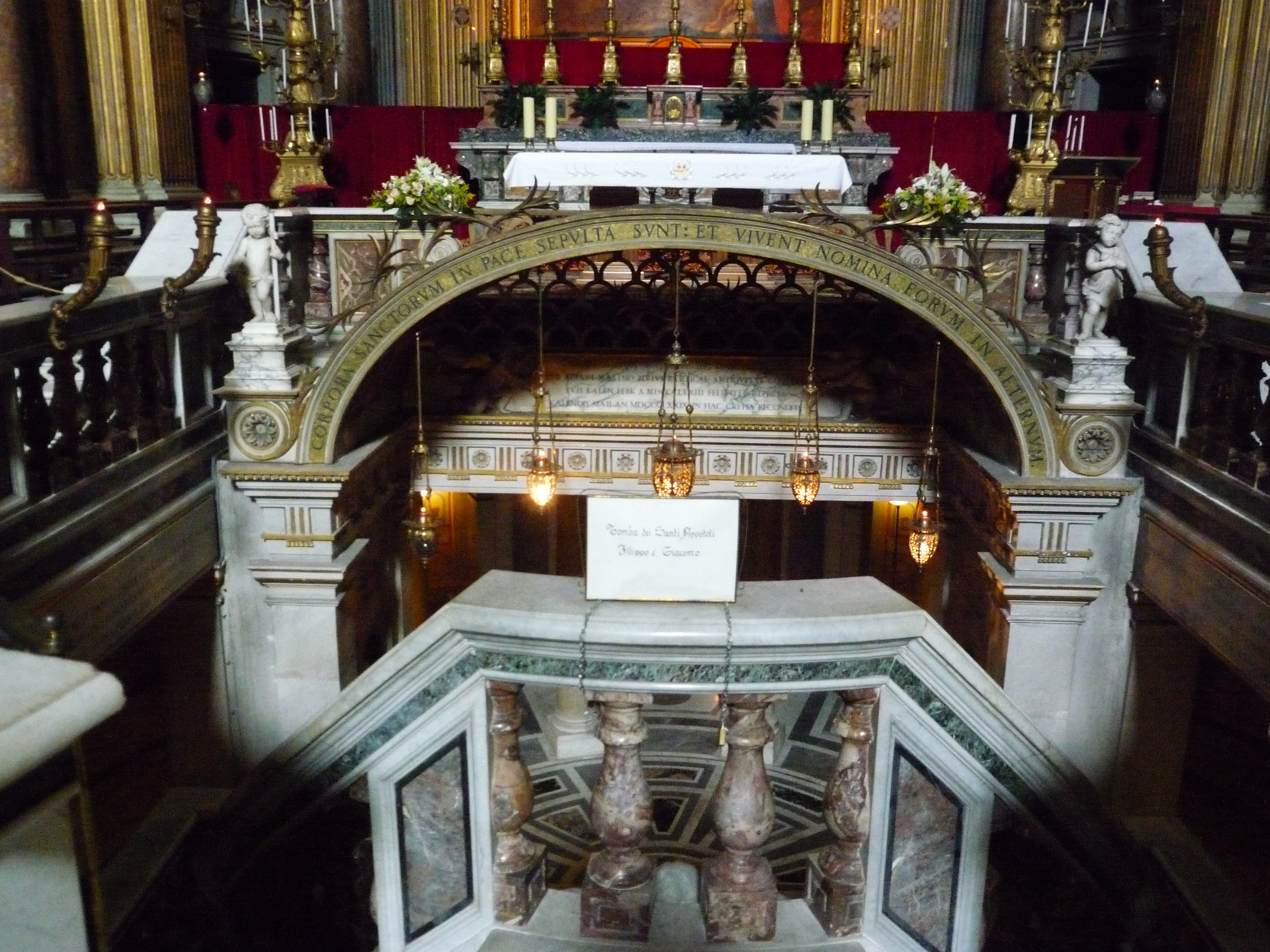
Entrance to the crypt

The confessio was constructed in 1871. During its construction, the relics of St James and St Philip, which were taken from the catacombs in the 9th century to protect them from invaders, were rediscovered under the high altar. The wall paintings are reproductions of ancient catacomb paintings. An inscription explains that Pope Stephen IV walked barefoot in 886 from the catacombs to the church carrying the relics on his shoulders.

=== Frescoes of Melozzo da Forlì ===
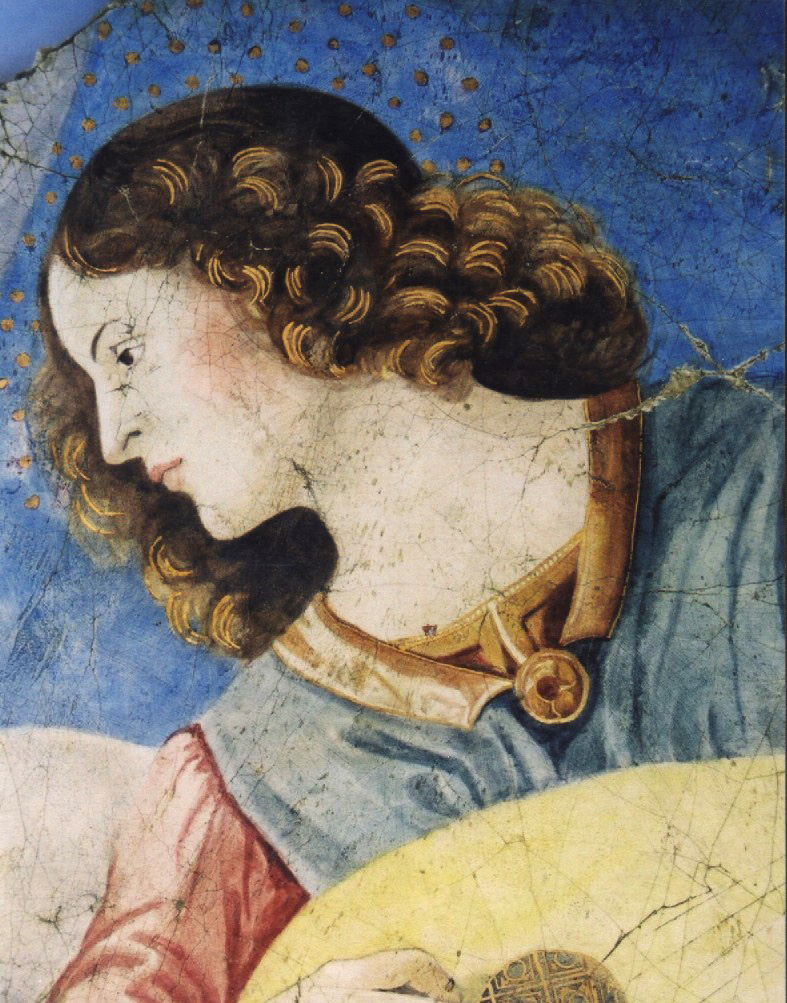
A fragment of the removed fresco by Melozzo da Forlì

About 1472, Melozzo da Forlì was commissioned by Cardinal Pietro Riario to paint the vault of the apse, his subject being the Ascension of Christ. It is one of the earliest known examples of perspective applied to the human figure on a roof or ceiling decoration. According to Giorgio Vasari, "the figure of Christ is so admirably foreshortened as to appear to pierce the vault; and in the same manner the angels are seen sweeping through the field of air in two opposite directions."

This fresco was taken down in 1711 when Clement IX enlarged the choir. The figure of Christ is now in the Quirinal Palace. Some of the other portions, which influenced Raphael, are in the sacristy of St Peter's. A hall in the Vatican Museums holds designs of angels and apostles by Melozzo, taken from the same fresco.

=== Chapels ===
The twelve side chapels were reduced in number during the renovations of Clement IX.

- The first chapel on the left is dedicated to Our Lady of Sorrows.
- The second chapel was dedicated to St. Joseph of Cupertino. The altarpiece from 1777 is by Giuseppe Cades. The two columns of verde antico, green marble, are reputed to be the largest known in that type of stone.
- The third chapel of the left is dedicated to St. Francis of Assisi, containing The Ecstasy of St Francis by Giuseppe Bartolomeo Chiari.

Pope Clement XIV (1769–1774) is buried at the end of the left side aisle, near the door of the sacristy. His Neo-Classical tomb is by Antonio Canova, made in 1783-1787. Besides the statue of that Pope, there are two uncommonly fine figures of "Temperance" and "Clemency". This was the first major work Canova did in Rome.

- The first chapel on the right-hand side of the nave is dedicated to St Bonaventure. The altarpiece is by Niccolò Lapiccola. It also contains Antoniazzo Romano's Madonna, moved from the Bessarion chapel.
- The second chapel on the right is dedicated to the Immaculate Conception; the altarpiece is by Corrado Giaquinto.
- The third chapel of the left is dedicated to St. Anthony of Padua; the altarpiece (1723) is by Benedetto Luti. It is the chapel of the Odescalchi, whose palazzo was nearby.
- Behind the Odescalchi chapel is the funerary chapel of Cardinal Bessarion. Antoniazzo Romano completed the decoration in 1467. It contained a 15th-century Madonna donated by Bessarion, now relocated to the Chapel of St. Bonaventure.
- The Chapel of the Crucifixion is to the right of the main altar. Designed as a small basilica, it has a nave and two aisles. The 8 columns are from the 6th-century church.
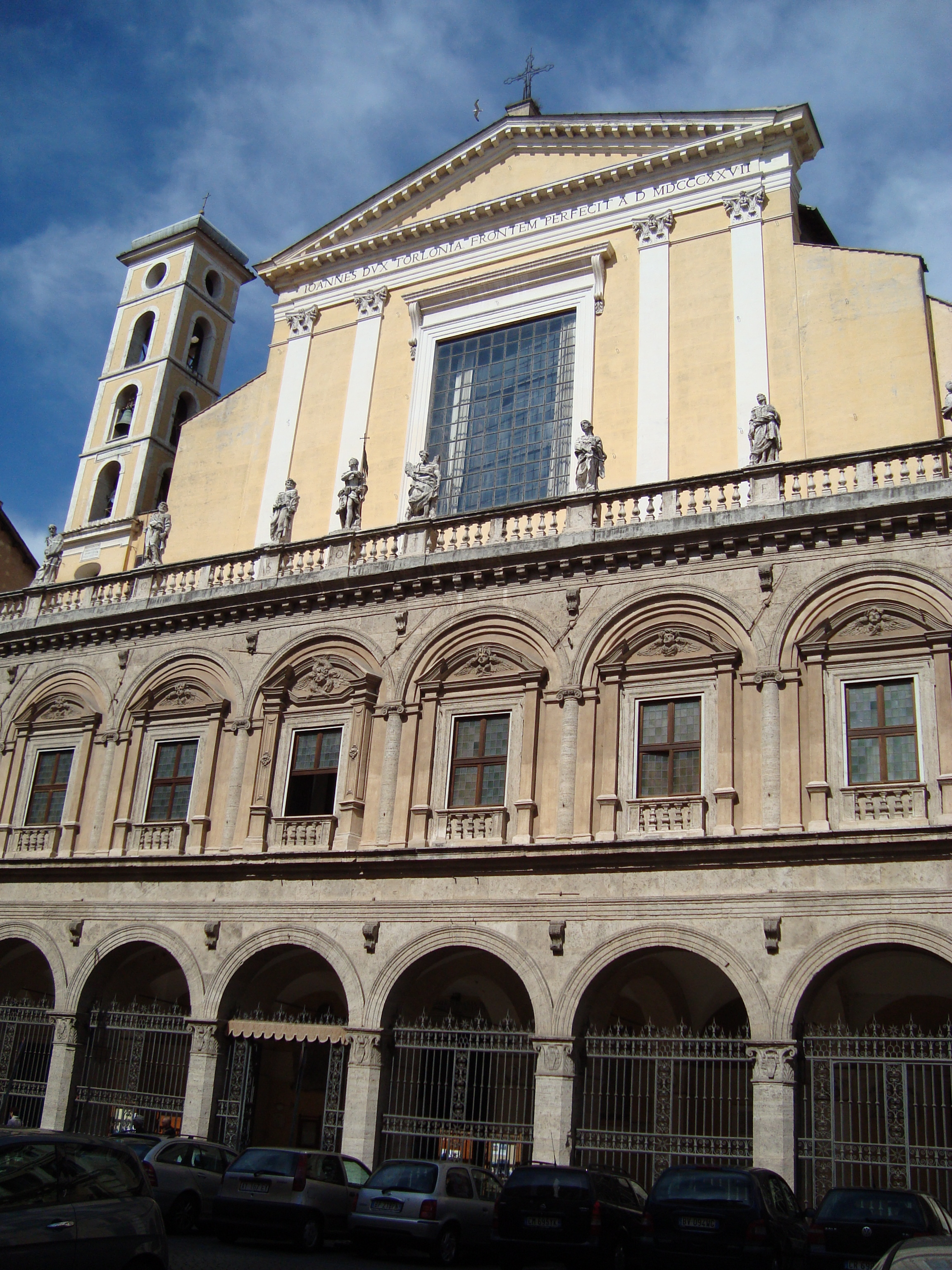
Basilica dei Santi Apostoli

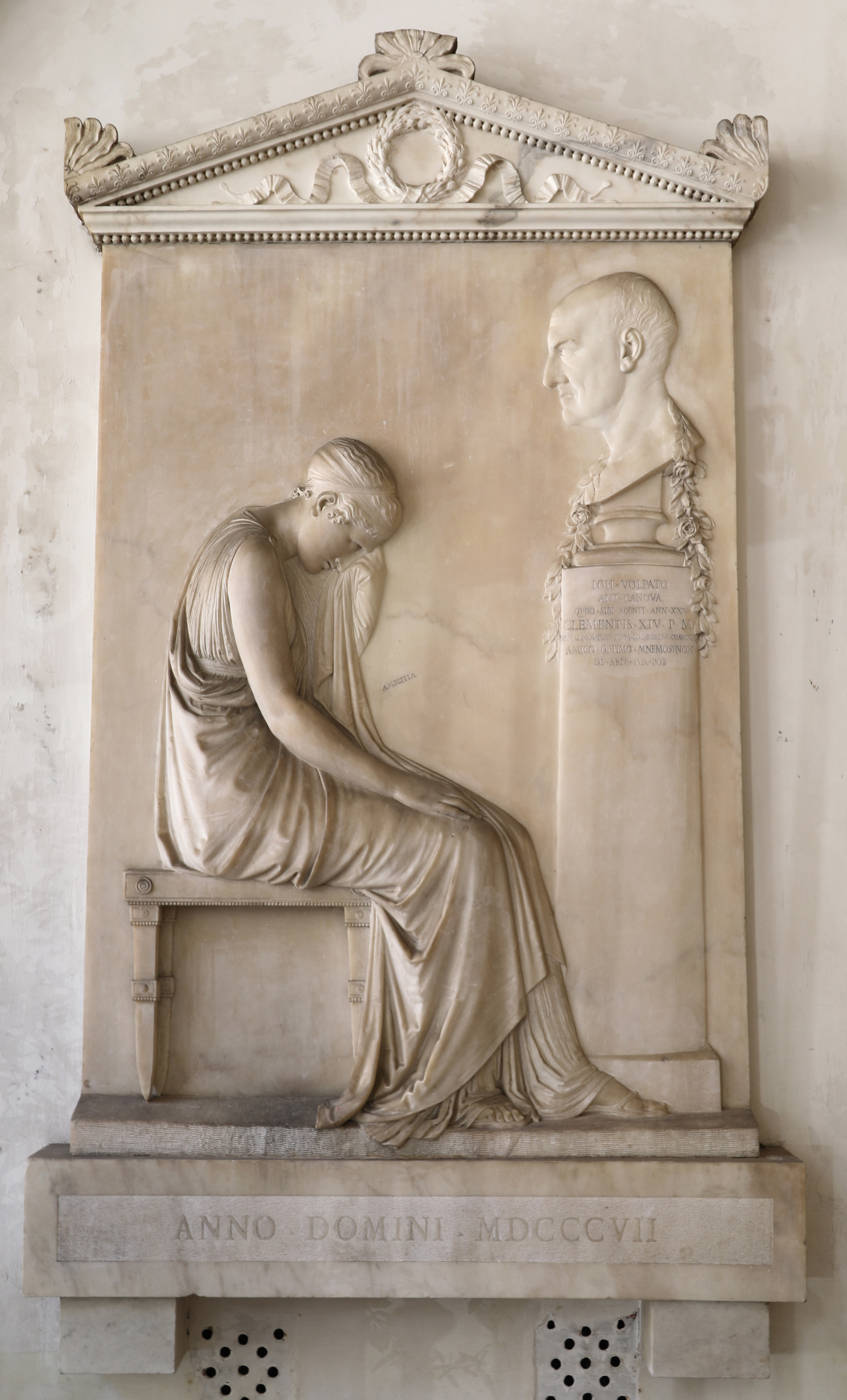
Volpato monument by Canova (portico)

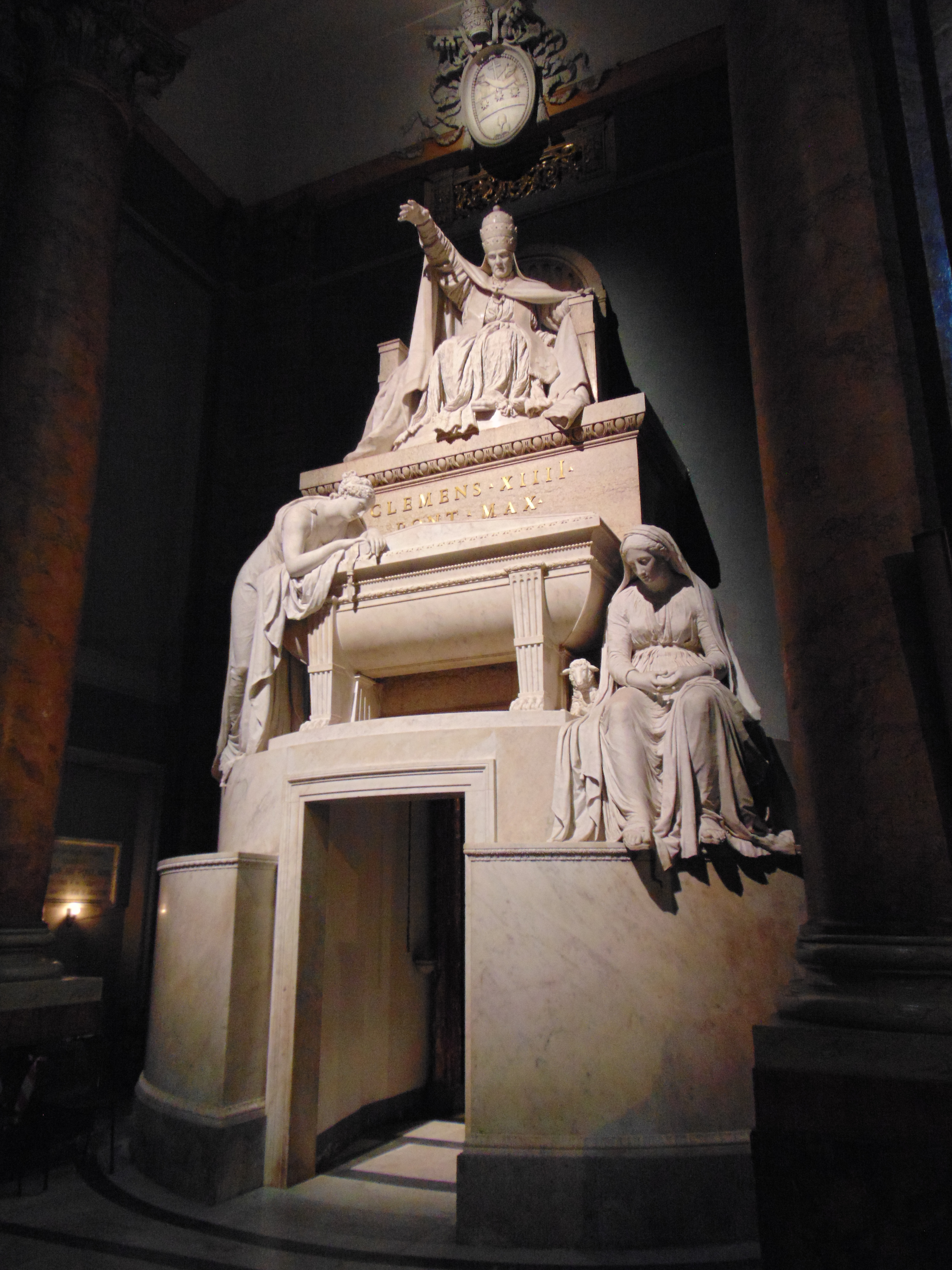
Tomb of Pope Clement XIV by Antonio Canova

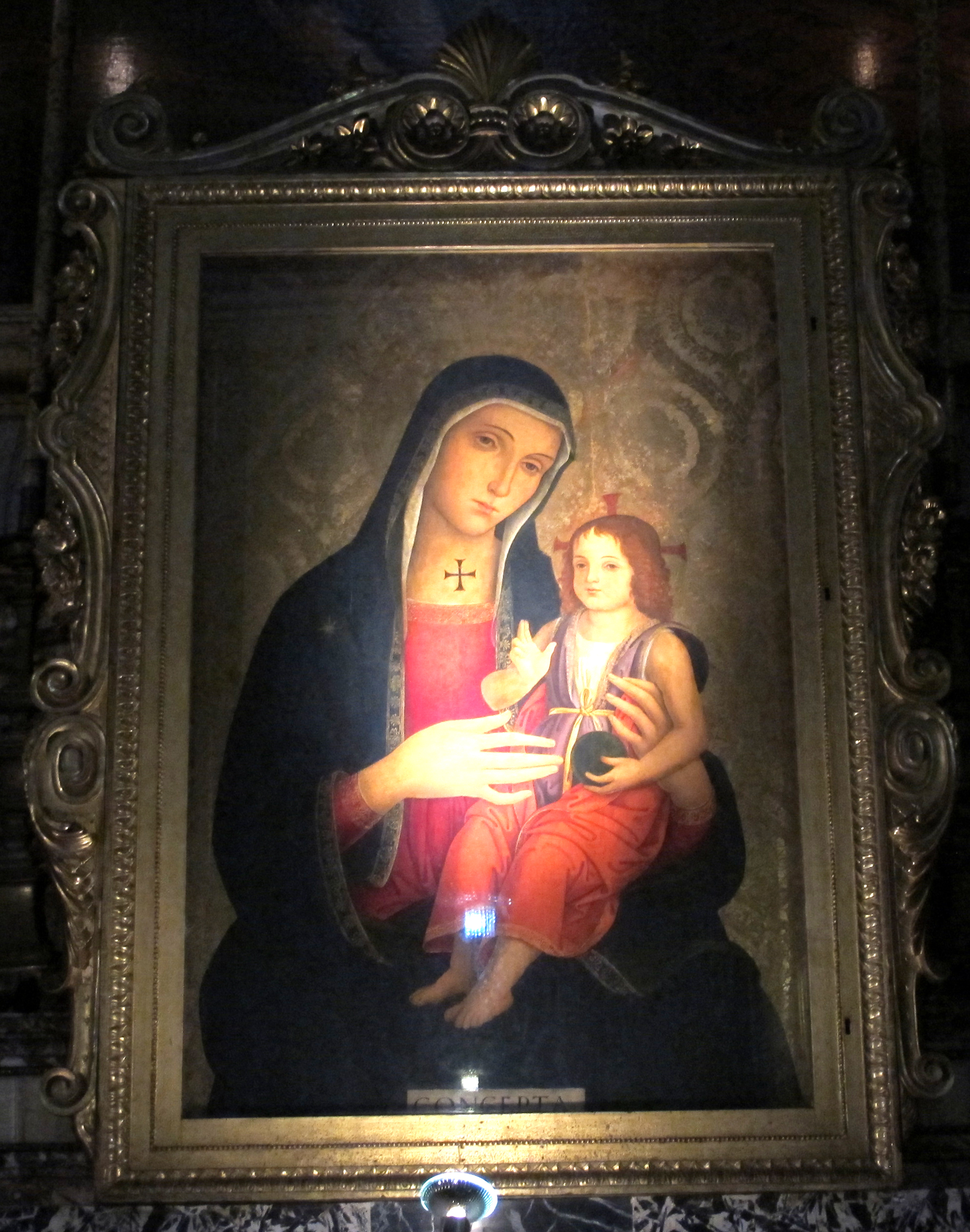
Madonna of Constantinople, Antoniazzo Romano

== Burials ==
- Cardinal Bessarion (1403–1472)
- Prospero Colonna (cardinal) (died 1463)
- Raffaele Riario (died 1521)
- Pope Clement XIV (1769–1774)
- Count Giraud de Caprières (died 1505)
- Cardinal Pietro Riario (died 1474)

For a short time, the basilica housed the tomb of Michelangelo, before its transportation to the Basilica di Santa Croce di Firenze. Upon the death of James Francis Edward Stuart in 1766, his body lay in state here before he was buried with his wife at St. Peter's Basilica.

== List of Cardinal-priests since 1059 ==
List of the cardinal titulars of the church

- Bernardus (attested in 1059)
- Gregorius (by 1102 - 1112) went into schism against Pope Paschal II.
- Hugo (Ugone d'Alatri) (by 1116 - after 10 November 1121)
- Gregorius (restored) (by 6 April 1123 - 1138). He followed Anacletus II in the schism of 1130.
- Ildebrandus (1156 - 1178)
- Pandulfus de Masca (1182 - 1201)
- Stephanus de Ceccano, O.Cist. (1213 - 1227)
- Guillaume de Talliante O.S.B. (1244 - 1250)
- Annibale Annibaldi de Molaria O.P. (1262 - 1272)
- Gerardo Bianchi O.Cist. (March 1278 - 1281)
- Imbertus de Puteo (Dupuis) (18 December 1327 - 26 May 1348)
- Pectin de Montesquieu (17 December 1350 – 1 February 1355)
- Pierre de la Forêt (23 December 1356 – 7 June 1361)
- Bernard du Bosquet (22 September 1368 – 19 April 1371)
- Robert de Genève (30 May 1371 – 20 September 1378)
- Jan Očko of Vlašim (18 September 1378 – 14 January 1380)
- Pietro Filargis (12 June 1405 – 26 June 1409)
- Basilios Bessarion (8 January 1440 – 18 November 1472)
- Clemente Grosso della Rovere (6 December 1503 – 18 August 1504)
- Leonardo Grosso della Rovere (17 December 1505 – 15 September 1508)
- Francesco Soderini (15 September 1508 – 29 October 1511)
- Pompeo Colonna (13 November 1517 – 28 June 1532)
- Alonso Manrique de Lara (12 July 1532 – 28 September 1538)
- Pedro Sarmiento (15 November 1538 – 13 October 1541)
- Miguel da Silva (6 February 1542 – 5 October 1543)
- Durante Duranti (9 January 1545 – 24 December 1557)
- Markus Sitticus von Hohenems Altemps (10 March 1561 – 15 May 1565)
- Marco Antonio Colonna (15 May 1565 – 5 December 1580)
- Rodrigo de Castro Osorio (20 May 1585 – 18 September 1600)
- François de Sourdis (20 December 1600 – 30 January 1606)
- Domenico Ginnasi (30 January 1606 – 16 September 1624)
- Desiderio Scaglia (9 February 1626 – 6 October 1627)
- Francesco Maria Brancaccio (9 January 1634 – 2 July 1663)
- Paluzzo Paluzzi Altieri degli Albertoni (15 March 1666 – 1 December 1681)
- Francesco Lorenzo Brancati di Lauria (1 December 1681 – 30 November 1693)
- Giorgio Cornaro (7 April 1698 – 10 August 1722)
- Benedetto Erba Odescalchi (29 January 1725 – 13 December 1740)
- Domenico Riviera (2 January 1741 – 2 November 1752)
- Henry Benedict Stuart (18 December 1752 – 13 July 1761)
- Pope Clement XIV (29 March 1762 – 19 May 1769)
- Francisco de Solís Folch de Cardona (26 June 1769 – 21 March 1775)
- Giovanni Archinto (15 July 1776 – 1 June 1795)
- Francisco Antonio de Lorenzana (24 July 1797 – 17 April 1804)
- Dionisio Bardaxí y Azara (29 April 1816 – 27 September 1822)
- Carlo Odescalchi (16 May 1823 – 15 April 1833)
- Francesco Serra Casano (29 July 1833 – 17 August 1850)
- Antonio Francesco Orioli (30 September 1850 – 20 February 1852)
- Giusto Recanati (10 March 1853 – 17 November 1861)
- Antonio Maria Panebianco (23 December 1861 – 21 November 1885)
- José Sebastião de Almeida Neto (10 June 1886 – 7 December 1920)
- Pietro La Fontaine (7 March 1921 – 9 July 1935)
- Ignatius Gabriel I Tappuni (19 December 1935 – 11 February 1965)
- Francesco Roberti (26 June 1967 – 16 July 1977)
- Agostino Casaroli (30 June 1979 – 25 May 1985)
- Giovanni Battista Re (21 February 2001 – 1 October 2002)
- Angelo Scola (21 October 2003 – incumbent)

== Bibliography ==
- Giovanni Antonio Bonelli, Memorie storiche della Basilica costantiniana dei SS. XII.: Apostoli di Roma e dei nuovi suoi ristauri (Roma: Tipi del Salviucci, 1879).
- Rezio Buscaroli, Melozzo da Forlì nei documenti (Roma: Reale accademia l'Italia, 1938).
- Emma Zocca, La basilica dei S.S. Apostoli in Roma (Roma: F. Canella, 1959).
- Nicholas Clark, Melozzo da Forlì: pictor papalis (London: Sotheby's Publications 1990).
- L. Finocchi Ghersi, La Basilica dei Santi Apostoli a Roma tra il XV e il XIX secolo (Roma: La Sapienza 1990) [dissertation]
- Isabelle Jennifer Frank, Melozzo Da Forli and the Rome of Pope Sixtus IV: (1471 - 84) (Cambridge: Harvard University Press 1991).
- L. Finocchi Ghersi, "Francesco Fontana e la basilica dei Santi Apostoli a Roma," Storia dell'Arte no. 73 (1991), pp. 332–60.
- Lorenzo Finocchi Ghersi, La basilica dei SS. Apostoli a Roma: storia, arte e architettura (Roma: Artemide, 2011).

| Preceded by Sant'Apollinare, Rome | Landmarks of Rome; Santi Apostoli, Rome | Succeeded by Santa Balbina |
