= Pelawatte =

Pelawatte පැලවත්ත பெலவத்தை
- Suburb
- Location within Sri Lanka
- Coordinates: 6°53′28″N 79°55′42″E
- Country: Sri Lanka
- Province: Western Province
- District: Colombo District
- Time zone: UTC+5:30 (Sri Lanka Standard Time Zone)

Pelawatte also spelled Pelawatta is a part of Battaramulla main town which is a suburb of Colombo located near to the new Parliament of Sri Lanka. It is one of the overpopulated areas in the city.

The Ministry of Education 'Isurupaya', the Department of Examination are located in Pelawatte and the Independent Television Network (ITN) television broadcasting station are also located in the vicinity of Pelawatte.

It also contains the only church in the world of Saint John dal Bastone.

== Schools ==
- Overseas School of Colombo
- Vidyawardena Maha Vidyalaya
