= Cardinals created by Clement XIV =

Catholic appointments from 1769 to 1773

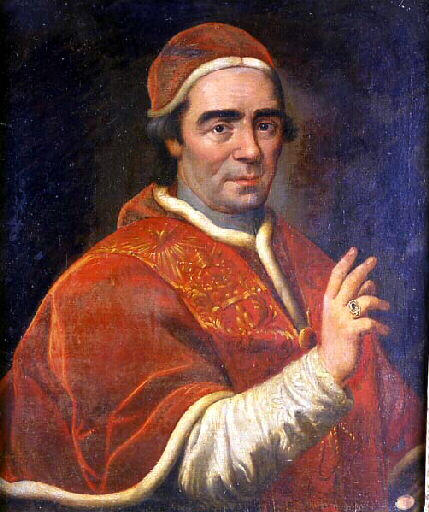
Pope Clement XIV (1705-74).

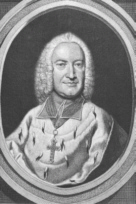
Leopold Ernst von Firmian (1708-83), made a cardinal on 14 December 1772.

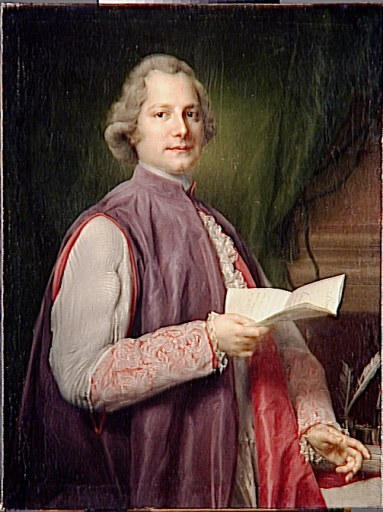
Francesco Carafa di Trajetto (1722-1818), made a cardinal on 19 April 1773.

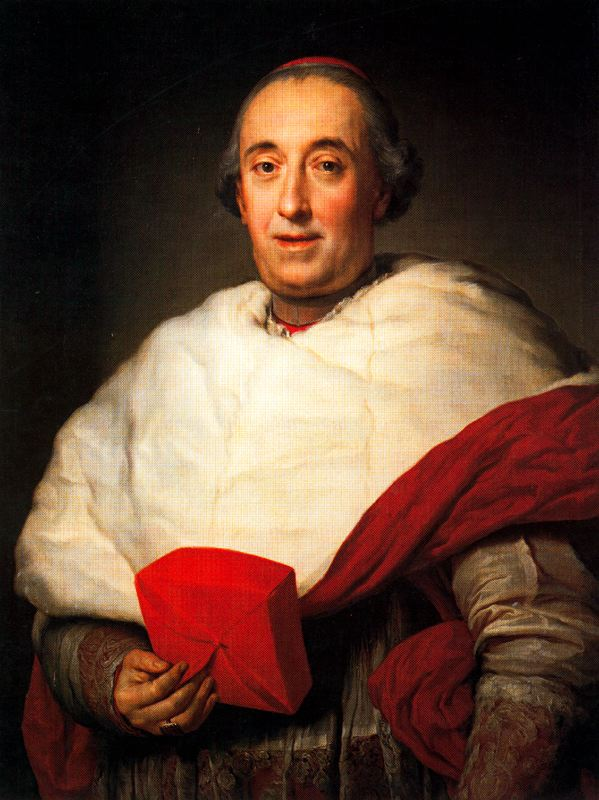
Francesco Saverio de Zelada (1717-1801), made a cardinal on 19 April 1773.

Pope Clement XIV (r. 1769–1774) created 16 cardinals in twelve consistories.

== 18 December 1769 ==
1. Paulo de Carvalho de Mendoça

== 29 January 1770 ==
1. Mario Marefoschi

== 6 August 1770 ==
1. João Cosme da Cunha

== 10 September 1770 ==
1. Scipione Borghese
2. Giovanni Battista Rezzonico

== 12 December 1770 ==
1. Antonio Casali
2. Pasquale Acquaviva d'Aragona

== 17 June 1771 ==
1. Antonio Eugenio Visconti
2. Bernardino Giraud

== 23 September 1771 ==
1. Innocenzo Conti

== 16 December 1771 ==
1. Charles-Antoine de La Roche-Aymon

== 14 December 1772 ==
1. Leopold Ernst von Firmian

== 15 March 1773 ==
1. Gennaro Antonio de Simone

== 19 April 1773 ==
1. Francesco Carafa di Trajetto
2. Francesco Saverio de Zelada

== 26 April 1773 ==
Clement named two cardinals at this consistory and created another eleven cardinals in pectore. He died without announcing their names and their appointments lapsed.

1. Giovanni Angelo Braschi
2. Francesco D'Elci

== Additional sources ==
- Miranda, Salvador. "Consistories for the creation of Cardinals 18th Century (1700-1799): Clement XIV". The Cardinals of the Holy Roman Church. Florida International University. OCLC 53276621.
