= Tomb of Pope Clement XIV =

Funerary monument by Antonio Canova

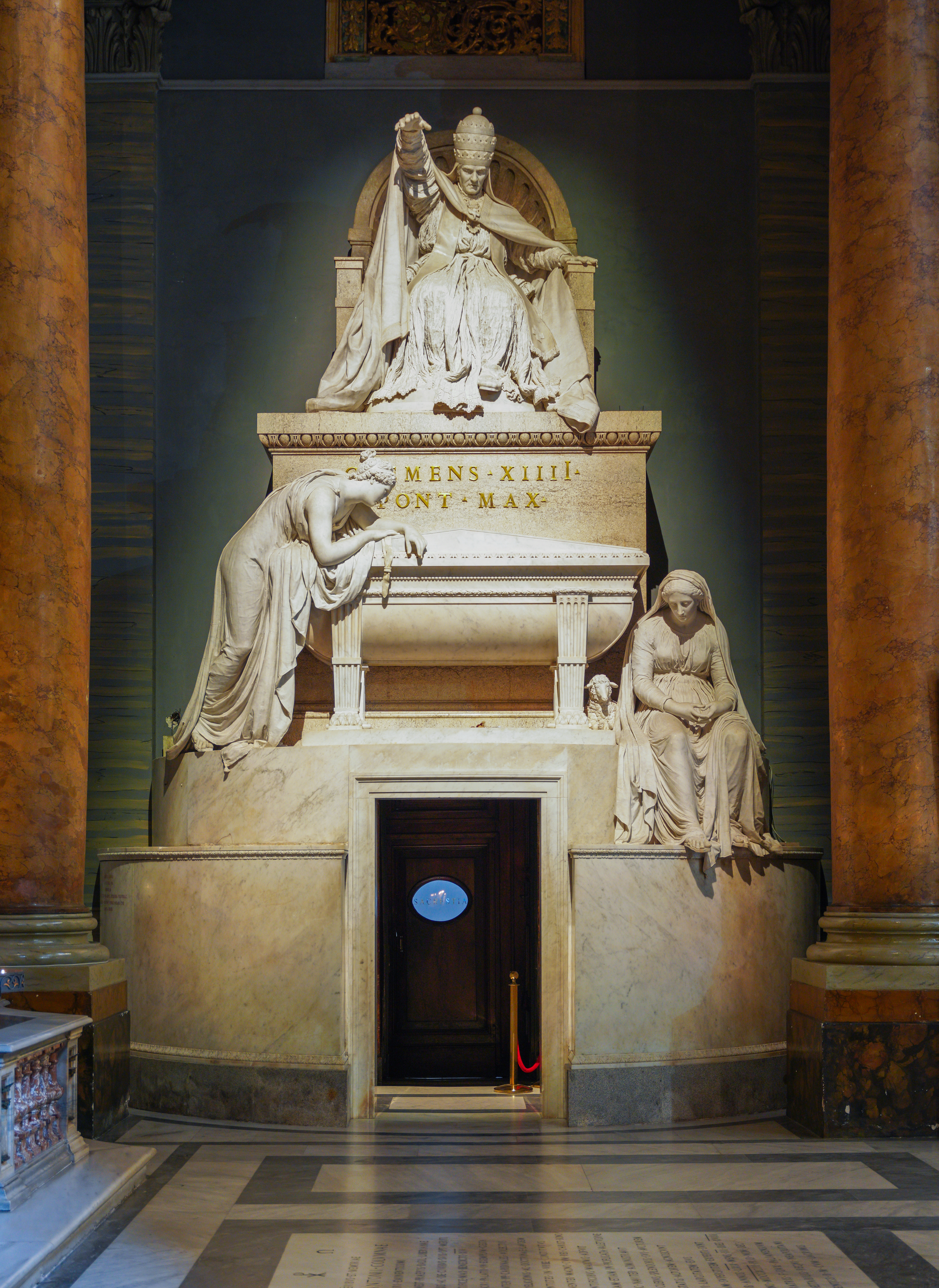
- Artist: Antonio Canova
- Year: 1783–1787
- Type: Sculpture
- Medium: Marble
- Subject: Pope Clement XIV
- Location: Santi Apostoli, Rome

The Tomb of Pope Clement XIV is a neoclassical stone monument and sculptural tableaux in Santi Apostoli, Rome by the Venetian sculptor Antonio Canova. The work is in the church where Pope Clement XIV (1705-1774) was the Cardinal-Priest before being elected Pontiff.

The monument was commissioned by the merchant Carlo Giorgi and completed in 1787, thirteen years after the Pope's death. Canova employed carrara marble and lumachella in the creation of the tomb.

The figure of Pope Clemens XIV atop the tomb is said to reference St. John the Baptist.
