= The Thebaid (painting) =

c. 1460 painting by Paolo Uccello

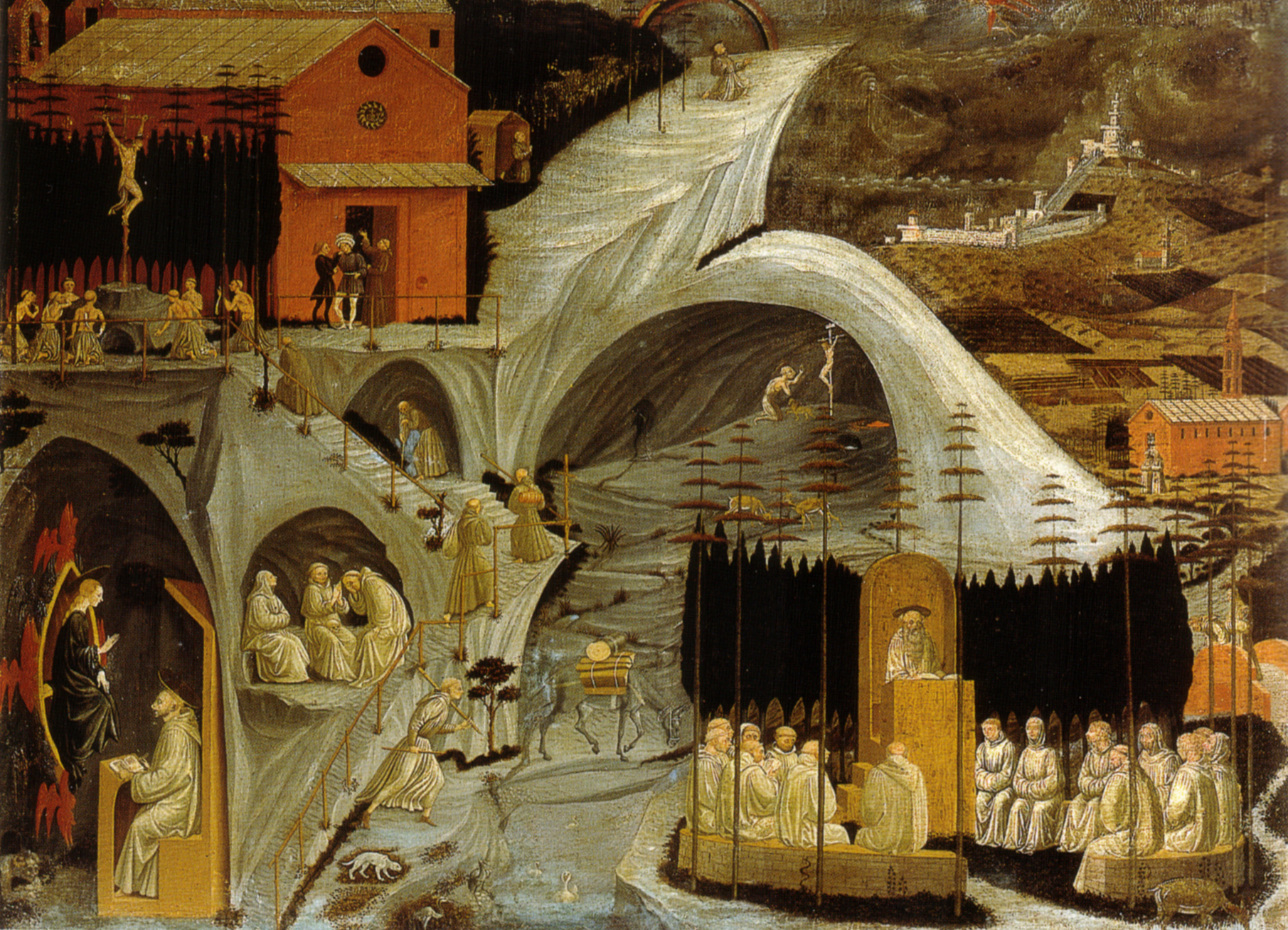
The Thebaid (c. 1460) by Paolo Uccello

The Thebaid is a tempera on canvas painting by Paolo Uccello, executed c. 1460, also known as Scenes from the Lives of the Saints and Monks and The Life of the Holy Fathers. It was originally painted for the monastery of San Giorgio alla Costa in the Oltrarno area of Florence and later moved to the Uffizi. It is now in the Galleria dell'Accademia in Florence.

It is comparable in subject to Uccello's Scenes of Monastic Life in the cloister of San Miniato al Monte and in style to his The Miracle of the Desecrated Host. Its title refers to the Thebaid, a desert region around Thebes in Egypt inhabited by early Christian hermits. It shows specific episodes in the lives of various monastic and eremitic saints:

- Francis of Assisi receiving the stigmata from a vision of Christ as a seraphim (top middle)
- Jerome adoring a crucifix in his cave (centre)
- Bernard of Clairvaux's vision of the Virgin Mary (bottom left)
- Benedict of Nursia preaching to his monks (bottom right)

It also shows several scenes of general monastic and eremitic life:

- flagellants around Christ on the cross (top left)
- a landscape of a fortified town, churches, tilled fields and a monastery, with two monks in contemplation (top right)
- two young men outside a monastery with a monk welcoming them (to the right of the flagellants)
- two monks and a nun in a cave (under the two young men)
- monks climbing a prayer route through a rocky landscape (emerges from the flagellants and Christ on the cross)
- a monk holding a staff and a hoe near a grazing ass carrying his load (bottom centre)

== Bibliography ==
- (in Italian) Franco Borsi and Stefano Borsi, Paolo Uccello, 1992
- (in Italian) Annarita Paolieri, Paolo Uccello, Domenico Veneziano, Andrea del Castagno, Scala, Florence, 1991. (ISBN 88-8117-017-5)
