= Sylvestrines =

Congregation of monks of the Order of St Benedict

- Sylvestrine Congregation
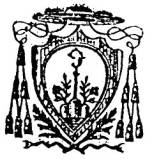
- Emblem of the Sylvestrine Congregation of the Benedictine Order
- Abbreviation: O.S.B. Silv.
- Formation: c. AD 1231; 795 years ago
- Founder: Sylvester Gozzolini
- Type: Catholic religious order
- Headquarters: Italy
- Website: silvestrini.org

The Sylvestrines are a congregation of monks of the Order of St Benedict who form the Sylvestrine Congregation. The Sylvestrines use the post-nominal initials O.S.B. Silv.. The congregation was founded in 1231 by Sylvester Gozzolini. They are members of the Benedictine Confederation. The congregation is similar to others of eremitical origin, in that their houses are not raised to the status of an abbey, which would entangle the monasteries more strongly in the affairs of the world. The congregation, though, is led by an abbot general, the only abbot it has, who supervises all the houses of the congregation.

== History ==
Sylvester Gozzolini (1177–1267) was born at Osimo near Ancona, Italy. As a young man, he entered a community of Augustinian canons regular who served Osimo Cathedral, and eventually was professed in that Order and received Holy Orders. Around 1227, he left the community to lead an austere, eremitical life. Disciples flocked to him, however, and in 1231 he built a hermitage by the mountain of Montefano in the March of Ancona (near the town of Fabriano). The congregation was approved in 1247 by Pope Innocent IV as the Ordo S. Benedicti de Montefano.

The community that Sylvester founded followed the Rule of St. Benedict, but, as regards poverty in external matters, was far stricter than the general Benedictines of the time. At Sylvester's death in 1267, there were eleven Sylvestrine monasteries. At their peak, there were 56 monasteries in the congregation, mostly in Umbria and Tuscany, as well as in the March of Ancona. The Church of San Marco in Florence belonged to the Sylvestrines, but in 1437, through the efforts of Cosimo de' Medici, they were displaced in favor of the Dominicans and moved to the smaller San Giorgio alla Costa.

Like all religious communities in Europe, the Sylvestrines suffered throughout the 19th century from the upheavals of the French Revolutionary Army and the later unification of Italy. Their principal house was the Monastery of Santo Stefano del Cacco in Rome, dedicated to St. Stephen the Protomartyr, which was founded in 1563 to serve as the motherhouse of the congregation. Notable Sylvestrine include the founder, Sylvester Gozzolini, Bl. Giovanni del Bastonne, and the Bl. Giuseppe and Ugo di Serra San Quirico.

== Expansion ==
For most of its history, the Congregation was confined to Italy. The Ceylon Mission was begun in 1845, their first foundation outside Europe. The Sylvestrines provided many of the clergy for that missionary diocese well into the 20th century.

Additionally, they have monasteries in the United States, the first being established in Atchison, Kansas, where two monks arrived in 1910 and served the spiritual needs of the many workers in the coal industry there. As that industry faded and the local population began to move away, they looked elsewhere to build a permanent home. They were welcomed into the Archdiocese of Detroit in 1928, where they built their first monastery in the country in 1938, St Benedict of Oxford Monastery, which serves as the orders headquarters in the United States. There is a daughter house Holy Face Monastery in Clifton, New Jersey.

A conventual priory was founded in 1962 in Australia at Arcadia, Sydney, Australia, by an Italian monk serving in Sri Lanka. Now, there are also monasteries in India. In the late 20th century, a foundation was set up in the Philippines and, more recently, in the Democratic Republic of the Congo.

== Present day ==
The Sylvestrine monks operated as a completely autonomous congregation for most of their history, until they joined the Benedictine Confederation in 1973. This placed the congregation under the general supervision of the abbot primate of the Benedictine Order and joined them to the life of the entire Order throughout the world. As of 2020, there are three monasteries in Italy (Montefano, Bassano, and Giulianova).

On 28 May 2019, Father Antony Puthenpurackal OSB of Saint Joseph’s Conventual Priory, Makkiyad, India became abbot general of the congregation.

The habit is dark blue, as compared to the standard black worn by most other Benedictines.

== Saints, Blesseds, and other holy people ==
=== Saints ===
- Silvestro Guzzolini (c. 1177 – 26 November 1267), founder of the Order, canonized on 29 August 1890.

=== Blesseds ===
- Filippo da Varano di Recanati (13th century), one of Silvestro Guzzolini's first disciples, declared Blessed by popular acclaim.
- Giovanni della Cella (aka Giovanni Solitario) (13th century), hermit, declared Blessed by popular acclaim.
- Ugo de Actis (c. 1227 - 26 July 1270), monk, beatified on 27 July 1757.
- Giuseppe degli Atti de Actis (died 24 August 1273?), Second Prior of the Order and brother of Ugo degli Atti, declared Blessed by popular acclaim.
- Giovanni dal Bastone (24 March 1200 – 24 March 1290), monk, beatified on 29 August 1772.
- Bartolo di Cingoli (first half of the 13th century - 3 August 1298), Third Prior of the Order, declared Blessed by popular acclaim.
- Benvenuto da Piticchio di Acervia (died unknown), monk, declared Blessed by popular acclaim.
- Giacomo da Attigio da Fabriano (died unknown), monk, declared Blessed by popular acclaim but no official cult.
- Bonaparte (died unknown), monk, declared Blessed by popular acclaim but no official cult.
- Simone da Ripalta (13th century - 14th century), monk and one of Silvestro Guzzolini's first disciples, declared Blessed by popular acclaim.

=== Venerables ===
- Alfredo (Ildebrando) Gregori (8 May 1894 - 12 November 1985), founder of the Benedictine Reparatrix Sisters of the Holy Face, declared Venerable on 7 November 2014

=== Servants of God ===
- Bernardo Regno (18 August 1886 - 22 August 1977), Bishop of Kandy
