= Sylvester Gozzolini =

Italian Catholic saint (1177–1267)

Saint Sylvester Guzzolini
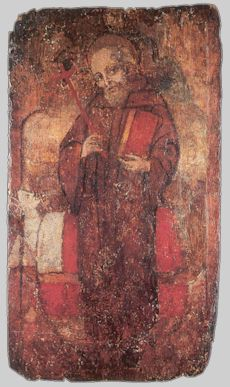

Confessor
- Born: 1178; Osimo, Papal States
- Died: 26 November 1267 (aged 90); Fabriano, Papal States
- Venerated in: Catholic Church
- Beatified: 1267/69 by Pope Clement IV
- Canonized: 1598, Rome, Papal States by Pope Clement VIII
- Major shrine: Chiesa di Monte Fano
- Feast: 26 November
- Patronage: Silvestrini

Silvestro Guzzolini (1178 – 26 November 1267) was an Italian Catholic priest and the founder of the Silvestrini. He served as a canon in Osimo but respectful rebukes of his bishop's inappropriate conduct led him to leave for a hermitage before the bishop could strip him of his position. He remained in his hermitage with a determination to found a religious congregation and based it upon the Order of Saint Benedict after having a dream of Benedict of Nursia. His order received papal approval from Pope Innocent IV which allowed his order to expand across Italian cities to a significant degree.

His beatification was confirmed in the 1260s after his death in 1267, and he was later canonized in 1598 as a saint.

== Life ==
Silvestro Guzzolini was born to Gislerio and Bianca Guzzolini in Osimo. He was sent in 1197 to learn jurisprudence in the college at Bologna, for law, and the college in Padua. Finding no satisfaction in his studies and deeming them too secular, he felt called to the ecclesiastical state and abandoned his studies in law for theological and scriptural studies.

On his return home in 1208 it is said that his father—angered at his change of purpose —refused to speak to him for ten years. After the diocesan bishop ordained him in 1217, Guzzolini accepted a position as a canon at Osimo. He devoted himself to pastoral work with such zeal as to arouse hostility from his bishop, whom he had respectfully rebuked for the scandals that the prelate's irregular life had caused.

The prelate threatened to strip him of his position, but Guzzolini decided to leave the world when, while presiding over a funeral, he saw the corpse of one who had once been noted for their looks. He retired to a deserted place far from Osimo in 1227 and lived there in strict poverty until the owner of the land, the nobleman Corrado, recognized him and offered him a better site for his hermitage. The damp drove him from that place, and he established himself next at Grotta Fucile where he later built a convent for his future religious order. In this place his penances were most severe, for he lived on raw herbs and water and slept on the bare ground. He may have been inspired by saint Bonfilius, a hermit who originally had also come from Osimo and lived his final years in a hermitage close to Filottrano. Sylvester later build one of the first monasteries in his name close to this hermitage and likely also wrote the first biography of Bonfilius.

Disciples flocked to him seeking his direction and it became vital for him to choose a Rule. His fame worried Pope Gregory IX in 1228, who decided to send the Dominican friars Riccardo and Bonaparte to him to invite him into their order, but he refused. Legend suggests that the various founders appeared to him in a vision each begging him to adopt his Rule. Guzzolini chose for his followers that of Benedict of Nursia in 1231, after having a vision of him, and built his first convent on Montefano near Fabriano, after first removing the remains of a pagan temple.

On 27 June 1248, he obtained from Pope Innocent IV a papal bull confirming his order as being canonical. By the time of his death Gozzolini has founded eleven monasteries under this approval. He died on 26 November 1267 due to a severe fever; Doctor Andrea embalmed him and the room was filled with a sweet fragrance when he removed Guzzolini's bowels. His remains were later disinterred and placed in a shrine, which is still present at the church of Monte Fano.

== Sainthood ==
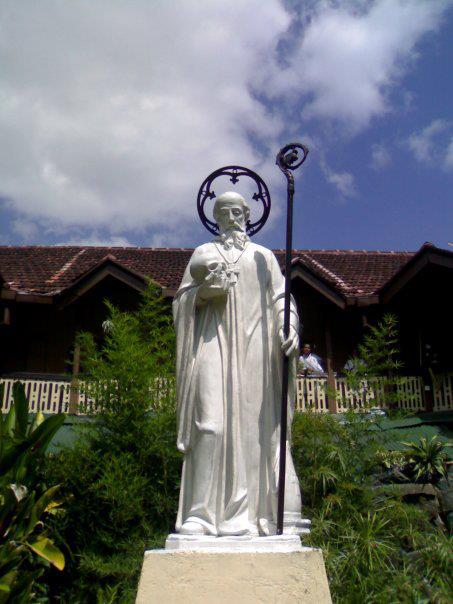
Statue at St. Sylvester's College in Sri Lanka

The account of his miracles and the growth of his "cultus" (or longstanding veneration) can be found in Bolzonetti. Pope Clement IV beatified Guzzolini and Pope Clement VIII later canonized him in 1598. Pope Leo XIII included his Mass and office in the General Roman Calendar in 1890 with the rank of Double (third-class feast in the 1960 reform of Pope John XXIII) therefore reducing to the status of a commemoration that of Pope Peter I of Alexandria who shared that date. In 1970, that celebration was removed and relegated to the local calendar since it was not a feast of universal importance.

== See also ==
- Sylvestrines
- Tridentine calendar
- General Roman Calendar of 1954
- General Roman Calendar of 1960
