= Social class in Sri Lanka =

Class and caste systems in Sri Lanka

Social class in Sri Lanka is often described as casteless, though caste is still found on the island in both a symbolic and a practical sense. Caste is also used in an analogous sense to refer to the new social class divisions that have appeared in recent decades. The combination of ethnic nationalist movements that saw caste as an island-wide dividing tool, strong emphasis on providing access to education and healthcare regardless of background, and historic lack of discrimination among the colonial civil service played a factor in eradicating the caste system in most sectors of the island's society. Although the Buddhist culture actively fought against all forms of class discrimination, many Buddhist organizations used caste as a method to extract surplus from temple property.

== History ==
=== Lanka ===
==== Caste system ====
Buddhism rejects casteism as a fundamental principle of its worldview, and this has an effect on reducing the severity of the caste system on the island. Notably, the highest caste group in both communities of the island also formed the popular majority for both communities.

The caste systems in Sri Lanka were organized in a similar manner to the Jāti systems found in South India. The history of the caste system in Sri Lanka is unclear since there is very little historical evidence and much research carried out into the subject has been criticized as being biased. Caste positions did not correlate with wealth.

Goyigama was the most common caste in the Sinhalese community numbering around 50%. These people were basically landowning farmers but had monopolized the high positions in politics and royal courts. Vellala is the term used for the similar community among Tamils. Brahmins did not have as much influence on the island as on the mainland, and the most politically influential caste belongs to the farmers.

The documented history of the island begins with the arrival of Prince Vijaya from India. The island was reportedly inhabited by four tribes at that time: the Dewa, Nagas, Yakkas and Raksha. Although the origin of Sri Lankan communities is unclear, genetic studies on Sinhalese have shown that most of the Sinhala community is genetically related to the South Indians and Bengalis. About half of the Sinhalese population are Govigama. Of the three native tribes, it is believed that the Dewa are part of the Sinhalese castes.

Ancient Sri Lankan texts, such as the Pujavaliya, Sadharmaratnavaliya, Yogaratnakaraya and inscriptions, show that a fourfold caste category namely Raja, Bamunu, Velanda and Govi existed among the Sinhalese. Evidence of this hierarchy can be seen during the 18th century British-Kandyan period, indicating its continuation even after the Sri Lankan monarchy. Colonialism and foreign intervention in the dynastic conflicts of the island throughout history has also influenced the caste system, some suggesting even a re-arrangement of the occupational castes. At present 13 castes are commonly found among the Sinhala viz. Radala, Govigama, Bathgama, Deva, Nekathi, Bodhivansha, Rajaka, kumbal, Hunu, Durava, Karava, Salagama and Navandanna, with smaller castes being absorbed to the larger castes.

===== Kandyan castes =====
In the Central Highlands, many traditions of the Kingdom of Kandy were preserved from its 1818 collapse beyond independence in 1948 and the Land Reform Act of the 1970s. Most Govigama were however ordinary farmers and tenants as absolute land ownership was exclusive to the king until the British colonial period. In addition to the Govigama, there were several strata of occupational castes. Wahumpura or Deva were the caste who traditionally made jaggery and farmed. The Bathgama caste was also engaged in agriculture with access to some land. The Navandanna (Achari) caste were artisans. The Rada were washers, and this caste is still prevalent in Sri Lanka's laundry sector. The Berava were traditional drummers and agricultural wage labourers. The Kinnara caste did menial work and were segregated from the rest of the community. The most important feature of the Kandyan system was Rajakariya ("the king's work"), which linked each caste to an occupation and demanded service to the court and religious institutions.

===== Southern castes =====
There were differences between the caste structures of the highlands and those of the low country, although some service groups were common to both in ancient Sri Lanka. The southwestern coast had three other castes (the Salagama, the Durava and the Karava) in addition to the majority Govigama, which was common throughout the region. Some of these castes' ancestors are believed to have migrated from Southern India and have become important in the Sinhalese social system. The first-century BC Anuradhapura Abayagiri inscription referring to a Karava navika may be the first reference to a specialized occupation.

===== Tamil castes =====
The Tolkāppiyam Porulatikaram (தொல்காப்பியம் பொருளதிகாரம்) indicating the four-fold division is the earliest Tamil literature to mention caste. Sangam literature however mentions only five kudis associated with the five tinais. Colonialism also had influenced the caste system.

Their caste system had stronger religious ties than its Sinhalese counterpart, although both systems have comparable castes. In the caste system observed, there were distinctions between Northern and Eastern societies, and also the agricultural and coastal societies.

In the agricultural society were mainly the castes of the Vellalar, Nalavar and Koviar, where the Vellalar caste is the dominating one, particularly in Northern Sri Lanka. They approximately constitute half of the Sri Lankan Tamil population and were the major land-owning and agricultural caste.

The Northern and Western coastal society was dominated by the Karaiyars, traditionally a seafaring and warrior caste. The Thimilar and the Paravar were also among the coastal communities involved in fishing. The Mukkuvars, traditional pearl divers, dominate greater parts of Eastern Sri Lanka where they were the major landowners also involved in agriculture.

The artisans, known locally as Kammalar or Vishwakarma consists of the Kannar (brass-workers), Kollar (blacksmiths), Tattar (goldsmiths), Tatchar (carpenters), Kartatchar (sculptor). the Ambattar (barbers), Kadaiyar (lime burners), Koviar (farmers), Kusavar (potters), Maraiyar (conch blowers), Nattuvar (musician), Nalavar (toddy-tappers), Pallar (farm workers), Paraiyar (drummers), Turumbar (scavengers) and Vannar (dhobies) constituting the domestic servants termed as Kudimakkal. The Kudimakkal gave ritual importance in marriage, funeral and other temple ceremonies.

Other Sri Lankan Tamil castes of importance were the Cirpatar (cultivators), Iyer (priests), Kaikolar (weavers), Madapalli (former royal cooks), Shanar (toddy-tappers) and Maravar (Poligar-Warriors). The Sri Lankan Chetties, traditional merchants, along with the Bharatha people, traditional seatraders, were listed as their own ethnicities in Sri Lankan census. The Coast Veddas, found mainly in Eastern Sri Lanka were considered a Tamil caste among the Sri Lankan Tamils.

The village deities of the Sri Lankan Tamils were also shaped by the caste structure. The Sri Lankan Moors don't practice the caste system, however, follow a matriclan system which is an extension of Tamil tradition.

=== Ceylon ===
With the onset of colonial rule in the country, different castes emerged with new occupations. However, social mobility was present since the colonial rulers didn't impose hereditary occupations as was the case in the Kandy Kingdom. Therefore, it is identified that this is the point at which the caste began to be limited to a social culture rather than an occupational group. Newer castes originated at this point such as the powerful Mudaliyar class who loyally served their colonial masters.

By the late 19th century the upper-class natives of Ceylon (called Ceylonese by the British) formed a second-class group in their own land, serving their colonial masters. The finest example of this would be the famous second-class and third-class carriages used by the Ceylonese on the trains due to the first being reserved only for Europeans. This upper class of Ceylonese derived their wealth from land holdings that were passed down the generations and derived their power from serving in posts in the British colonial administration. At first, these were limited to special posts reserved for natives such as Rate Mahattaya in the central highlands and the Mudaliyars in the coastal areas, letter as the new generation of these native chieftains grew up educated in the Christian missionary schools, public schools modelled after their English counterparts and at British Universities they were taken into the Ceylon Civil Service, others took up places in the Legislative and later the State councils. Entering into this upper class were successful merchants who gained wealth in the lucrative mining industry of the time.

A middle class emerged during this period of a bourgeois people who gained their status by Professions or by Business.

=== Sri Lanka ===
The 20th century brought several changes to the social structure. By the 1940s when Ceylon gained Independence from the British (in 1948) there were four social groups. The upper class is made up primarily of landowners, the Upper middle class of educated professionals holding traditional jobs such as Lawyers, Doctors, Army officers, Academics, senior Civil Servants and police officers; and merchants. The political leaders of the new Dominion of Ceylon came from these two classes. The lower middle class was made up of persons who were educated but held less prestigious, but respected jobs such as lower-level public servants, policemen, and teachers.

This order changed dramatically in the 1970s due to the land reforms brought on by the government of Sirimavo Bandaranaike who limited private ownership of land to 50 acres (20 ha) and ownership of private houses to two (later changed), excess land was nationalized along with many industries. This rendered the wealthiest who made up the Upper class and Upper middle class greatly dependent on a secondary income void of their income and with it their power. Following the failure of the socialist economic drive of the 1970s the new government of J R Jayewardene opened up the country's economy to free market reforms. This along with the civil war saw major change in the social structure.

The direct result of the changes of the 1970s and the 1980s was witnessed only at the late 20th century and the start of the 21st century. Today;

== Society ==
=== Upper class ===
The upper class in Sri Lanka is statistically very small and consists of industrialists, businessmen, senior executives and serving government ministers. These people are the wealthiest in the land, having in some cases inherited money and position, and in other cases having earned it themselves. Their educational backgrounds may vary, but they typically send their children to national, private or international schools to be educated in English and thereafter send them to overseas universities.

=== Upper middle class ===
The upper middle class in Sri Lanka consists of educated professionals. Traditional jobs include lawyers, university lecturers, doctors, engineers, senior military officers, senior civil servants, managers, and businessmen who generally come from educated backgrounds, having been educated at public or private schools and local or foreign universities. They manage their own business that has a high income. They typically send their children (depending on family income, traditions, and residence) to national, private or international schools to be educated in English or in their local languages. For university education, they may be sent to overseas universities or local private higher education institutions (depending on family income).

=== Middle class ===
The middle classes include government workers such as teachers, and government department workers and manage small businesses such as retail businesses and service providers. Some can afford to put their children into private national schools but refrain from the more expensive private international schools. The Sri Lankan national universities are mainly for the Middle classes. The middle-class university students do travel abroad on university scholarships.

=== Lower middle class ===
The lower middle class in Sri Lanka consists of people in blue-collar jobs living in less prosperous suburbs. This class constitutes the largest of Sri Lanka's social groups. Typically they have not had a university education, and send their children to national or provincial schools to be educated in their local languages (depending on family residence or scholarships). For university education, if selected they may be sent to local state universities, if not local private higher education institutions.

=== Lower class ===
These people would typically be on low incomes and dependent on state benefits. Many reside in the slums or shanty towns of cities or underdeveloped rural areas. They send their children to provincial schools to be educated in their local languages.

== Discrimination ==
Although caste discrimination is still found in Sri Lanka, particularly in rural areas, caste boundaries are blurring. Political power and wealth have largely replaced caste as the main factor in Sri Lankan social stratification, especially in the Sinhalese and Indian Tamil communities. Ponnambalam Ramanathan, under British Ceylon, opposed extending voting rights to the people and urged reservation of franchise only to men of the Vellalar caste.

In 1951 the Kandyan Peasantry Commission wrote, "... As a first step in the fight against caste it is necessary to abolish the service tenures." (R.K.P.C. 1951, p. 180.) Nur Yalman encountered caste division in the Ceylonese village of Terutenne in 1954. According to Lakshman et al., "The Social Disabilities Act of 1957 intended to outlaw caste-based discrimination" (p. 68, note 16).

== See also ==
- Caste system among South Asian Christians
- Caste system in India
- Caste system among South Asian Muslims
