= Caste system in Sri Lanka =

Traditional social stratification

The caste systems in Sri Lanka are social stratification systems found among the ethnic groups of the island since ancient times. The caste systems of Sri Lanka were historically not tied to the religious establishment but rather a tool to service the ruling elite -a model that was subsequently emulated within the European diaspora. At least three major, parallel caste systems exist in Sri Lankan society: Sinhalese, Sri Lankan Tamil and Indian Tamils.

A universal welfare system that focused on providing education for everyone regardless of background has provided people from lower caste groups similar opportunities to enter jobs previously only open to those in upper-caste groups, with younger generations mostly rejecting any pressure to conform to caste-related jobs. The Civil War has also broken down caste barriers as they were seen as an obstacle toward ethnolinguistic unity.

== Overview ==
The caste or feudal systems of the Sinhalese and Sri Lankan Tamils display some similar traits, where both systems have comparable castes with similar occupations and status.

The interior arable land is largely dominated by the Govigama caste under the Sinhalese and by the Vellalar under the Sri Lankan Tamils, who are traditionally involved as husbandmen and form approximately half the population of their respective ethnicities. The peasants under them are the Sinhalese Bathgama and Tamil Pallars. The coastal land is dominated by the Karavas under the Sinhalese and the Karaiyar under the Tamils. Both castes share a common origin with background in seafaring, trade and warfare. The artisans were collectively known as Navandanna by the Sinhalese and as Kammalar by the Tamils. They constituted of respective endogamous castes traditionally involved as blacksmith, goldsmith, coppersmith, carpenters and stonemasons. While toddy tapping was largely in the hands of the Sinhalese Durava and Tamil Nalavar, jaggery production was in the hands of the Sinhalese Vahumpura and Tamil Cantars. The traditional drummers of both ethnicities, the Sinhalese Berava and Tamil Paraiyar, have religious importance in Buddhism and Hinduism, respectively. The domestic castes of barbers and dhobies were the respective Sinhalese Ambattaya and Hinnava, and Tamil Ambattar and Vannar.

Political power and wealth have largely replaced caste as the main factor in Sri Lankan social stratification, especially in the Sinhalese and Indian Tamil communities. Ponnambalam Ramanathan, under British Ceylon, opposed extending voting rights to the people and urged reservation of franchise only to men of the Vellalar caste.

== Sinhalese castes ==
In traditional Sinhalese society Buddhist monks are placed at the top. Irrespective of the birth caste of a monk, even the king had to show respect to them.

The documented history of the island begins with the arrival of Prince Vijaya from India. Although the origin of Sri Lankan communities is unclear, genetic studies on Sinhalese have shown that most of the Sinhala community are genetically related to North Indians, with traces from South India too. The Library of Congress, claimed that about half of the Sinhalese population are Govigama.

Ancient Sri Lankan texts, such as the Pujavaliya, Sadharmaratnavaliya, Yogaratnakaraya and inscriptions, show that a feudal system namely existed among the Sinhalese. Evidence of this hierarchy can be seen during the 18th-century British-Kandyan period, indicating its continuation even after the Kandyan monarchy ceased in 1815. Colonialism and foreign intervention in the dynastic conflicts of the island throughout history have also influenced the caste system, some such as Robert Knox suggesting even a re-arrangement of the occupational castes.

Kandyan castes

In the Central Highlands, many traditions of the Kingdom of Kandy were preserved from its 1815 collapse beyond independence in 1948 and the Land Reform Act of the 1970s. Although large agricultural landlords belonged to the Govigama caste, many now may not own land. Most Govigama were however ordinary farmers and tenants as absolute land ownership was exclusive to the king until the British colonial period. The most important feature of the Kandyan system was Rajakariya ("the king's work"), which linked each caste to occupation and demanded service to the court and religious institutions.

The "Duraya" was a loose categorization of lower Kandyan castes, comprising the castes of Vahumpura, Puda, Panna, Velli, Berava, possibly Henaya, and more. The group was interpreted by the British for their own administrative purposes and was used loosely.

Low Country Sinhalese castes

There are still differences between the caste structures of the highlands and those of the low country, although some service groups were common to both in ancient Sri Lanka. The southwestern coast has three other castes (the Salagama, the Durava and the Karava) in addition to the majority of ancient Govigama, which is common throughout the region. Some of these castes' ancestors are believed to have migrated from Southern India and have become important in the Sinhalese social system. The first-century BC Anuradhapura Abayagiri inscription referring to a Karava Devika may be the first reference to a specialized occupation.

Sinhalese Castes and Sub-Castes during the later Colonial Period
Rank	Caste	Sub-Caste		Occupation	Location	Origin	% of population	Notes
1	Goyigama							
1	Goyigama	1a.	Radalavaru	Governing elite	Kandyan		~50%	
1	Goyigama	1b.	Mudaliperuwa	Knighted elite	Kandyan		~50%	
1	Goyigama	1c.	Ratè atto	Lesser officers of state	Kandyan		~50%	
1	Goyigama	1d.	Goviyo	Farmers	Kandyan		~50%	
2	Karava			Fisherman	Low Country	South India (13–18th Century) (Note: Salagama from the Coromandel Coast)	3/4 of Low Country population	Achieved a higher status under Portuguese and Dutch occupation.
3	Salagama			Weavers/Cinnamon peelers	Low Country	South India (13–18th Century)	3/4 of Low Country population	Achieved a higher status under Portuguese and Dutch occupation.
4	Durava			Toddy tapping/Coconut cultivators	Low Country	South India (13–18th Century)	3/4 of Low Country population	Achieved a higher status under Portuguese and Dutch occupation.
5	Navadanna			Artisans	Island wide			Status used to be above that of the Karava, Salagama & Durava
6	Hannāli			Tailors	Kandyan			Virtually extinct
7	Hunu			Chunam burners	Island wide			
8	Hēna			Washers to high castes	Island wide			
9	Vahumpura			Jaggery makers	Island wide			Claims higher status in Ancient periods
10	Hinnā			Washers to Salagama	Low Country			
11	Baḍahäla			Potters	Island wide			
12	Panikki			Barbers	Low Country			
13	Velli-durayi			Guardians of the sacred Bo tree	Kandyan			
14	Panna-durayi			Possibly grass-cutters	Kandyan			
15	Beravā			Tom-tom beaters	Island wide			
16	Batgam Beravā			Tom-tom beaters	Kandyan			
17	Kontadurayi			Unknown	Kandyan			
18	Batgam			Possibly King's Palanquin bearers	Kandyan			
19	Olī			Dancers	Island wide			
20	Palī			Washers to low castes	Kandyan			
21	Kinnara			Mat weavers	Kandyan			
22	Galaha-beravā			Funeral drummers and executioners	Kandyan			
23	Rodi			Beggars			1,500–3000	
24	Kavikara			Shrine dancers and chanters				
25	Demala-Gattara			Tamil outcastes	Low Country	South India (during Portuguese rule)		

== Sri Lankan Tamil castes ==
The caste system has stronger religious ties than its Sinhalese counterpart, although both systems have comparable castes. There are in the Sri Lankan Tamil caste system, distinctions between Northern and Eastern societies and also the agricultural, coastal and artisanal societies.

The agricultural society has mainly the castes of the Sri Lankan Vellalar who make more than half of the Tamil population in Sri Lanka, Nalavar and Koviyar, where the Vellalar and the Koviyar castes are the dominating ones, particularly in Northern Sri Lanka. They constitute approximately half of the Sri Lankan Tamil population and are the major land owning and agricultural caste.

The Northern and Western coastal societies are dominated by the Karaiyars, who are traditionally a seafaring and warrior caste. The Paravar and the Thimilar are also among the coastal communities involved in fishing. The Paravars or Bharathas are traditionally found in the western part of the island in the Mannar region, who many also are descendants from South Indian Paravar traders and seamen who settled there under Portuguese rule. The Mukkuvars, traditional pearl divers in western Sri Lanka, dominate greater parts of Eastern Sri Lanka where they are the major landowners also involved in agriculture. The Mukkuvars are largely Muslims or Roman Catholic in the Puttalam region of the western part of the island, and predominantly Hindus in the eastern part of the island.

The artisans, known locally as Kammalar or Vishwakarma consists of the Kannar (brass-workers), Kollar (blacksmiths), Tattar (goldsmiths), Tatchar (carpenters), Kartatchar (sculptor). Along with the Kammalar were the Ambattar (barbers), Kadaiyar (lime burners), Koviar (farmers), Kusavar (potters), Maraiyar (conch blowers), Nattuvar (musician), Nalavar (toddy-tappers), Pallar (farmers), Paraiyar (drummers and weavers), Turumbar (dhobies) and Vannar (dhobies) the domestic servants termed as Kudimakkal. The Kudimakkal gave ritual importance in marriage, funeral and other temple ceremonies.

A few slave castes exist as well. One caste called the Demalagattaru were an ancient caste of Tamil captives during times of war between Sinhalese and Tamil.

Other Sri Lankan Tamil castes of importance are the eastern Vellalars, Cantar (oil-presser), Iyer (priests), Madapalli (former royal cooks), Seerpadar descendents of Chola Queen Seerpaatha thevi (udaiyars, poodies, land owners, worriers, cultivators), kaikolar (cotton-weavers), Siviyar (royal palanquin bearers) and Maravar (Warrior). The Sri Lankan Chetties, traditional merchants, along with the Bharatha people, traditional sea-traders, are both colonial South Indian migrant castes and listed as their own ethnicities in Sri Lankan census. The Coast Veddas, found mainly in Eastern Sri Lanka are considered a Tamil caste among the Sri Lankan Tamils.

The village deities of the Sri Lankan Tamils are also shaped by the caste structure. The Sri Lankan Moors don't practice the caste system, however, follow a matriclan system which is an extension of Tamil tradition.

== Indian Tamil castes ==
The Tolkāppiyam Porulatikaram indicating the four-fold division is the earliest Tamil literature to mention caste. Sangam literature however mentions only five kudis associated with the five tinais. Colonialism also had influenced the caste system.

Indian Tamils or Tamils of Indian origin (Hill Country Tamils, who were Indians brought to the island by the British as indentured labour) and the group of Indian Tamil people who migrated to Sri Lanka as merchants also follows the Indian caste system form which is called jāti. Their caste structure resembles that of a Tamil Nadu village.

Those who are considered to be of higher castes occupy the first row of line rooms, and that sect includes Maravar, Kallar, Agamudaiyar, Mudaliyar (kaikolars), Mutharaiyar (Watch mans) etc. They perform respectable jobs such as factory work and grinding of tea as minor labour work, on the other hand, they are also involved in business activities. Even though they belong to the labour category under the British rule and post-independence of the country, they were influential among conductors, tea makers, kanganese (or supervisors), and other officials. The workers considered low caste live in the dwellings that are away from the centre and these dwellings are called distant or lower lines. This group consists of Paraiyars, Sakkiliar, washers and barbers. The yard sweepers and changes of clothes are in the lowest rank.

== Caste discrimination ==
Historically, caste-based discrimination was widespread in the island, influencing social relations, political representation, and access to economic resources across both the Sinhalese and Tamil communities. Recording caste information in censors had been stopped in 1911 and caste information was removed from birth certificates in the early 20th century.The Constitution of Sri Lanka guarantees equality before the law and the Prevention of Social Disabilities Act of 1957 explicitly prohibit caste discrimination. Among the Sinhalese caste distinctions have diminished in urban areas, they remain relevant in matters such as marriage, temple patronage, and local leadership in parts of the Kandy District and the southern lowlands. Within the Sri Lankan Tamil community, caste hierarchies were more rigidly maintained, with the landowning Vellālar caste historically exercising social dominance and political leadership, while low-casts groups faced systemic exclusion from temple entry, education, and inter-caste marriage. In 1968, public agitation by oppressed castes took place over temple-entry in Jaffna, led to violent confrontations drawing attention to the persistence of caste oppression Tamil society.

== See also ==
- Aggañña Sutta
- Social class in Sri Lanka
- Caste system in India
