= Tamil settlement of Sri Lanka =

Migration to Sri Lanka

Tamil speakers, 1961

Tamil settlement of Sri Lanka refers to the settlement of Tamils, or other Dravidian peoples, from Southern India to Sri Lanka. Due to Sri Lanka's close proximity to Southern India, Dravidian influence on Sri Lanka has been very active since the early Iron Age or megalithic period.

During the protohistoric period (1000-500 B.C.) Sri Lanka was culturally united with southern India, and shared the same megalithic burials, pottery, iron technology, farming techniques and megalithic graffiti. This cultural complex spread from southern India along with Dravidian clans such as the Velir, prior to the migration of Prakrit speakers.

Once Prakrit speakers had attained dominance on the island, the Mahavamsa further recounts the later migration of royal brides and service castes from the Tamil Pandya Kingdom to the Anuradhapura Kingdom in the early historic period.

Trade relations between the Anuradhapura Kingdom and southern India existed, very probably from an early time. Very early in its recorded history Sri Lanka has seen groups of Southern Indians enter the island as traders, mercenaries and occasionally as invaders, but their significance to the wider Prakrit speaking demographics of the island was only peripheral in these stages.

From the third century BC Tamil influence on the political affairs of Sri Lanka became more pronounced. There were attempts by Tamils to usurp power of the Anuradhapura Kingdom (Note: See Sena and Guttika and Elara) which appear to have been motivated by the prospect of influencing its external trade. From about the fifth century AD onwards, Tamil mercenaries were brought to the island, this became more common from the seventh century. It is from the 10th century that more permanent settlements of medieval Tamil speakers begin in Sri Lanka. These were not extensive settlements, but they would be important in the fact that they formed the nucleus for later settlements in Northern and Eastern Sri Lanka. Tamil settlements then became fairly extensive early in the 11th century AD following the Chola conquest.

Following the invasion of Kalinga Magha in 1215 AD, and the subsequent establishment of the Jaffna Kingdom and Vannimai chieftaincies in the east, Tamil settlements became predominant in these regions.

During the Crisis of the Sixteenth Century (Note: Period of Sri Lankan history lasting from 1505–1594) up until the end of the British colonial period (Note: Period of Sri Lankan history lasting from 1815–1948) many Southern Indian and Tamil speaking groups were transported or migrated to Sri Lanka, many of whom assimilated into the native Sri Lankan Tamil and Sinhalese populations.

Today the two major Tamil communities are the Sri Lankan Tamils, who came to the island in waves of migration starting from the 3rd century BC, and the more recent Indian Tamils of Sri Lanka, who were brought as indentured labourers by the British during the colonial period.

== History ==
=== Anuradhapura period ===
Sri Lankan monarchs have intermarried with south Indian royalty and used the services of South Indian labor for millennia. According to the Mahavamsa, noblewomen and service groups from the Pandyan kingdom (Note: Located in present day Tamil Nadu) accompanied the settlement of Anuradhapura by Prakrit speakers. Epigraphic evidence describes traders and others self identifying as Damelas or Damedas (Sinhala Prakrit for Tamils) in Anuradhapura and other areas of Sri Lanka as early as 2nd century BCE. The idea of looking upon the Damelas as aliens was not prevalent in the early historical period.

Tamil mercenaries were brought to Anuradhapura by the Sinhalese rulers from the 5th century, and in ever larger numbers during the 7th-10th centuries CE. In the early stages they were brought for short periods and served political purposes, fighting on behalf of rulers whose positions were insecure or those who had aspirations of taking the throne.

=== Polonnaruwa period ===
Rajaraja I renamed the city Polonnaruwa to Jananathamangalam, near Anuradhapura and settled Velakkara Agampadi (Agampu+adi) soldiers (Agammudayar), These two Castes were subdivisions of the Tamil caste). They eventually assimilated to Sinhalese society. The Sinhalese family name Palihakkara (Palaikkarar) originated from the Velakkara soldiers and the suffix Agampadi in front of some names of the Salagama sub caste "Hewapanne"(militia) originated from the Agampadi soldiers, who married Salagama Hewapanne women, Large scale mercantile activity from peninsular India primarily came from the Coromandel Coast.

=== Transitional period ===
The majority Sinhalese caste structure, which has no religious sanctions attached to it, has accommodated recent Dravidian Hindu immigrants from South India leading to the emergence of three new Sinhalese caste groups-the Salagama, the Durava and the Karava. This migration and assimilation happened until the eighteenth century. Salagamas, whose caste legends allude to South India, came as weavers from Kerala. Many also worked as mercenary soldiers (Agampadi soldiers). Agampadi soldiers (mercenaries who were deployed in the army and as coast guards from Dambeniya rule onwards) came from Tamil Nadu. Some were punished by the King of Kotte, who imposed a tax on cinnamon. Eventually some became cinnamon peelers. According to some historians this was begun in 1406 by the King of Kotte. Another section is called "Hewapanne" or soldiers.

=== Crisis of the Sixteenth Century ===
During the period of the Crisis of the Sixteenth Century and the arrival of the Portuguese to Sri Lanka also saw the migration of various Southern Indian and Tamil speaking groups. The Bharatha people are descendants of Tamil speaking Paravar of Southern India who migrated to Sri Lanka under Portuguese rule during that time. Several hundreds of converted Christian Bharathas were brought from the Indian mainland to the western shores of Sri Lanka by the Portuguese to wrest control on the pearl trade.

Sri Lankan Chetties, Formerly considered a Sri Lankan Tamil caste, were also a class of Tamil speaking traders, who migrated from South India under Portuguese rule, and continued to during Dutch presence on the island. They settled mostly in western Sri Lanka, especially in the ports of Colombo and Galle from the 16th century to the mid-17th century. Some of the Chetties in Northern Sri Lanka were absorbed into other communities, mainly in the Sri Lankan Vellalar community, considered a subcaste known as Chetty Vellalar. The Chetties of Western Sri Lanka converted to Roman Catholicism under Portuguese rule while others converted to Anglican or Reformed Christianity under British rule and Dutch rule, respectively. Intermarriage and alliances between Sinhalese and Chetties were not uncommon thus many also got Sinhalised.

=== British Ceylon period ===
Like the Portuguese and Dutch, the British colonial period saw the transportation and migration of Tamils to Sri Lanka, but on a much larger scale. Indian Tamils were brought to Sri Lanka as indentured labourers during the 19th and 20th centuries to work on coffee, tea and rubber plantations owned by the British. Workers were recruited from around the Tamil Nadu cities of Tirunelveli, Tiruchirappalli, Madurai and Thanjavur in 1827 by Governor Edward Barnes on the request of George Bird, a pioneering planter. Many died during their first few months of employment. They were instrumental in the establishment of tea, rubber, coffee and coconut plantations and formed the bulk of the labour force of the plantation sector. These Indian Tamils were separate from an already existing trading community of Indian Tamils who were not part of the plantation economy.

Indian Tamils had been lumped together with Sri Lankan Tamils for the Sri Lankan Census from 1871 to 1901. Since 1911, Indian Tamils have been shown as a separate group, and revealed Indian Tamils constituting 12.9% of the total population, whereas Sri Lankan Tamils, who had lived in the country for centuries prior had a lesser population of 12.8%. Indian Tamils had formed the majority Tamil population in the country until the 1950s and 1960s when the Indian population was repatriated back to India. Many Indian Tamils, after acquiring Sri Lankan citizenship, also declared themselves as Sri Lankan Tamils.

Indian Moors were a grouping of people during the colonial period distinguished by their Muslim faith and whose origins traced back to the British Raj. Therefore, Indian Moors refer to a number of ethnic groups such as Memons, Bohra and Khoja. These groups tended to retain their own ancestral practices and language. However, the largest specific group were Tamils from South India. Indian Moors shared a similar history to Indian Tamils of Sri Lanka, but due to their decline and smaller numbers the Indian Moors have either returned to India or have declared themselves as being classified as Sri Lankan Moors.

== Communities ==
Present day communities who trace origins to Dravidian speakers from southern India:

- Sri Lankan Tamils
- Indian Tamils of Sri Lanka
- Indian Moors
- Sri Lankan Gypsy people
- Bharatha people
- Sri Lankan Chetties
- Karava
- Salagama
- Durava
