= Demala-Gattara =

Caste amongst the Sinhalese of Sri Lanka

Demalagattara (lit. Tamil serf) are a social group or caste amongst the Sinhalese of Sri Lanka. Demalagattara are mostly Theravada Buddhists by religion. They are generally considered Sinhalese but proclaim their Tamil ethnic origins, whereas all other South India-derived castes such as Karave, Salagama, Durave,Berava do not emphasise their Tamil links as part of their assimilation into Sinhalese society.

== Origins ==
As the mainstream Sinhalese speakers claim North Indian ethnic origins the presence of many South Indian type Jatis like the Demalagatara indicate a complex migration history from India to Sri Lanka. Demalagatara do not indicate any tribal origins like the other. Their place in the caste structure is related to a primary function associated with formerly martial origins. They were classed as a sub-caste of the Govigama during the British period. Many are agriculturalists and workers throughout the country.

== South Indian roots ==
Some anthropologists believe that the early society of Sri Lanka has looked to neighboring South India for manpower to fulfill functional needs as land was cleared and many new villages found. Demalagatara are believed to be descended from Maravar or Kallar like martial castes of South India who also play an important role as mercenaries medieval Sinhalese kingdoms. Similar caste exist in Kerala as Tamil padai Nair has roots from Maravar caste of Tamil Nadu.

== Etymology of Demalagattara ==
‘Demala’ is the Sinhala word for Tamil and ‘Gattara’ is the word used in ancient Sri Lankan rock inscriptions and literature to refer to serfs. Thus Demalagattara translates into English as ‘Tamil serfs’. ‘Agricultural serfs’ were part of the feudal land tenure system of Sri Lanka. There were also ‘domestic serfs’.

== Origin myths ==
The community says that they descended from soldiers who accompanied a 2nd-century BCE Tamil Chola King named as Ellara. But in reality the story is partly true, they are South Indian soldiers who got to settle down due royal grants but the actual time and the king(s) who granted them these privileges happened much later than indicated by their origin myth. Research on origins was carried out during the British Colonial period and is dated. (See Caste in Sri Lanka)
