= Siviyar =

- Religions: Hinduism
- Languages: Tamil
- Related groups: Idaiyar, Tamils, Sri Lankan Tamils

Siviyar (Tamil: சிவியார், lit. 'Chiviyar', also written Chiviar and Tamil: சிவிகையார், lit. 'Chivikaiyar') is a caste found in the Indian state of Tamil Nadu and Sri Lanka. They were traditionally palanquin bearers. They are a single community in Sri Lanka, but are however a subcaste of the Idaiyar caste in Tamil Nadu. According to Srinivasa Aiyangar “The Siviyar (palankeen bearers) and the Agattu-Charna sub-division of the Tamil ldaiyan caste are note-worthy, as affording a connecting link between them and the Samantas and Nayars of Malabar.

== Etymology ==
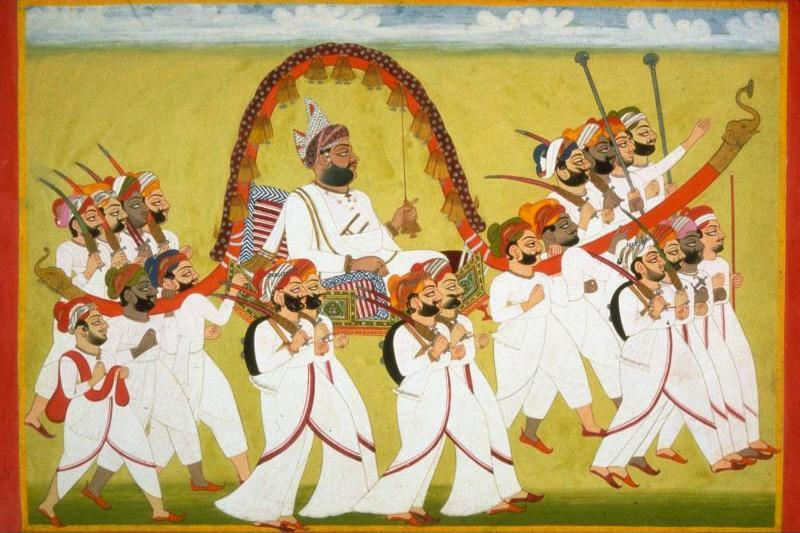
Royal palanquin bearers

The name is derived from the Tamil word Civikai meaning "palanquin" and the suffix -ar denoting honorific plural. Their headmen were known as Kūriyan, meaning "proclaimer", in reference to his proclaiming or announcement of the titles of the person whom he carries before the palanquin.

== History ==
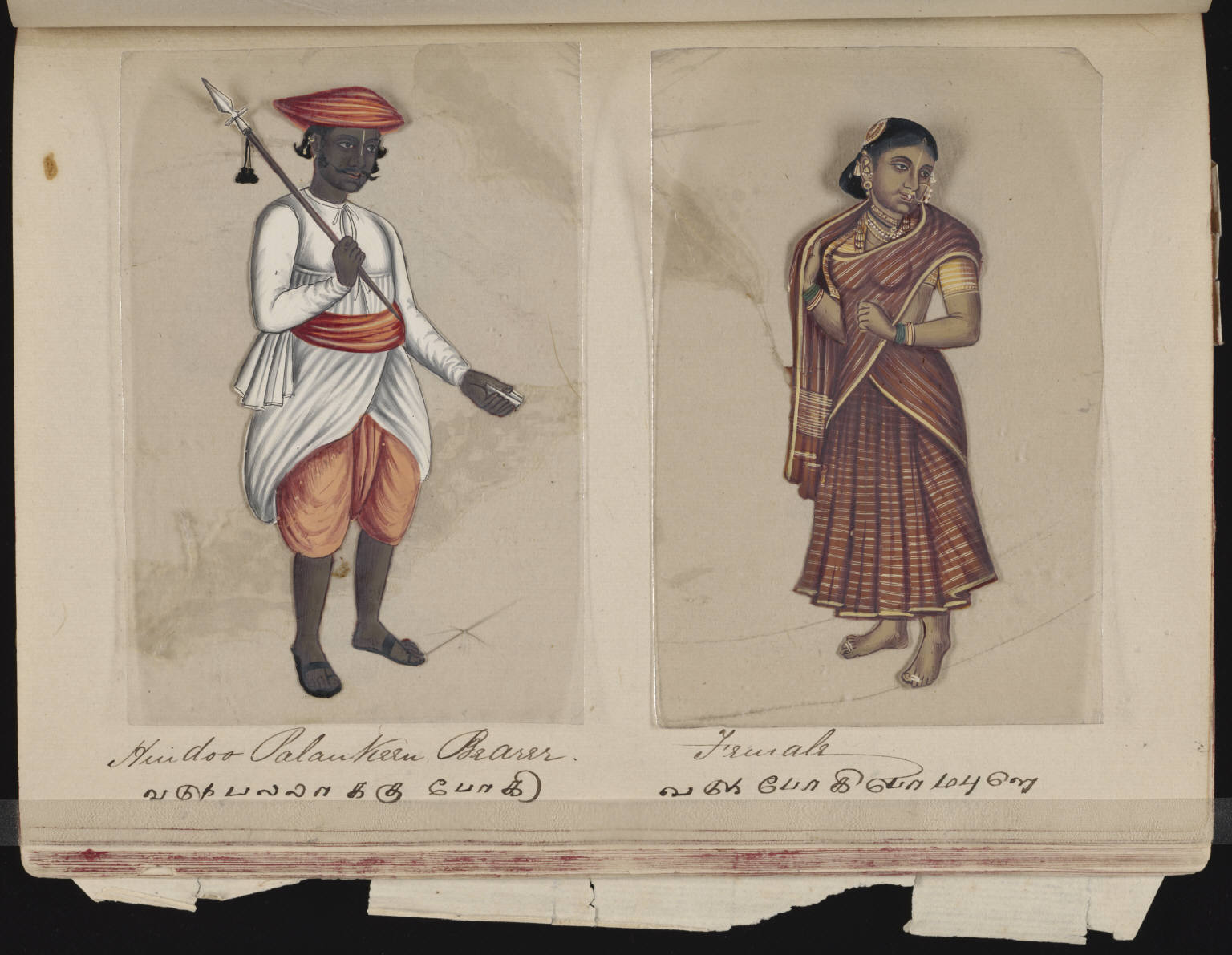
A palanquin bearer in 1837 Madurai

=== Siviyar of Jaffna ===
The Siviyars were royal palanquin bearers for the kings of the Jaffna kingdom. After the fall of the Jaffna Kingdom, during Dutch Ceylon they served as palanquin bearers, woodcutters and water carriers for the Commander and Dissava, and were an influential class in Jaffna. In a census taken in 1760 by Dutch in Jaffna there were 3 who held Mudaliyars title. Wouter Schouten described them “As a rule they are fairly intelligent and strong” and “so low-minded that they do not serve anybody cheerfully, but only those whom they believe to be men of consequence”. Dutch Predikant Baldaeus called them “Very proud on the score of being government servants and will bear no other persons, but such as are of some consequence” and compared them to “Gibeonites subsequently termed Nethinim”. Gibeonites were residents of Gibeon, a great city, as one of the royal cities and all the men thereof were mighty. When Israelites under Joshua about to conquest their city, they convinced the Israelites that there were from far land by wearing old clothes and shoes and taking old bread and wine. They entered a treaty with Joshua saying that they were their servants. When it was discovered that they were not from far land, Israelites were not happy that the princes entered a treaty with them. The princes said that since they swore oath on them let them live but let them be woodcutters and water carriers. Gibeonites evolved into Nethinim, the temple assistants. It is Portuguese who captured Jaffna before Dutch. Baldeus here probably inferring here that Siviyars “deceived” Portuguese by saying that they were just servants of Kings of Jaffna. When Portuguese invaders captured Jaffna, they exiled the Royalty to Goa and ensured that "all those who so much as have a royal smell about them" should be as far away from Jaffna as possible so it's probable that Siviyar escaped Portuguese wrath by pretending to be just servants. While Baldeus made biblical justification for the status of Siviyars during the colonial period, the British did not make such pretentions when they captured Kandyan Kingdom. British made the palanquin bearers of the Kandyan kings to carry the palanquin of the British high officers, a non-compliance with this regulation will subject the offending party to censure, fine or imprisonment.

All service castes in Jaffna served them. They held ancestral (paraveni) land free of land tax (renda) and paddy tax (areatane). Its customary to allocate land to palace officials, including royal palanquin bearers, for their service. An 1153 AD pillar inscription found in Mankanay, Trincomale, refers to the service tenure land granted to Mintan Korran (திருப்பள்ளி சிவிகையரில் கண்காணி மிந்தன் கொற்றனேன்), the Superintendent among the Palanquin bearers attached to the palace, a functionary of the royal court and in that capacity was a dignitary of considerable influence. This land was subsequently granted to a Buddhist religious institution. There were local elite group called "parumuka" mentioned in Srilankan brahmi inscriptions. Among the pramukas there was one called Sivika adeka, Superintendent of palanquin bearers. They were connected with Velirs of Tamil Nadu. Palanquin bearers were also known as Pokis/Bogis in Tamil (Bhogin in Sanskrit). The terms Bhogin, bhogika appear in many Indian inscriptions, referring to village head of a district, collector of the State's share of the produce of lands taken in kind, a village proprietor, Jagirdar or Inamdar, groom of horse-keeper and palanquin bearer but the meanings may have been derived from “Bhoga”, originally meant enjoyment but then property, as these people appear to have enjoyed rent-free land for their services.

It appears that Siviyar retain their Hindu identity during the Portuguese and Dutch period, a period all Hindu practices were prohibited in Jaffna. Baldaeus called them impious and profligate race verifying the adage “the nearer Rome, the worse the Christian”. In the late 19th century, they played a major role in Hindu revivalism in Jaffna. They retained Hindu names, Don Philip Vannia singa sekara kooriyan, Don Swam Gopala Ethirvanniya singa kooriyan, Kanaga sekara kothanda kooriyan, Arasa Soeria Nillajtta Koeriaan, Wirazamalliga Koerrian, Poeden Moddelllie Chidenberan, Oetten Arian during the Portuguese and Dutch period. “Don” is an honorific title given to the important persons by the Portuguese. The names "Chidenberan" and "Arian" are noteworthy. Jaffna hindus consider Nataraja Temple, Chidambaram as important pilgrimage place. Arumuka Navalar, the Hindu reformist from Jaffna established a school there. His ancestor Gnanapiragasar built a tank there now known as Gnanapiragasar Tank. The Kings of Jaffna, Aryacakravarti dynasty had titles such as aryacakravarti, singaiaryan, aryarkoman etc.

They are in Jaffna mainly concentrated in Ariyalai where they are divided in subcaste or labour groups; adikke, uppu, and arisi Siviyar. Theadikke-Siviyar are involved in ingraining wheat and curry-powder. The uppu-Siviyar are involved in salt making, and the arisi-Siviyar in rice cultivation. Several from the Siviyar caste were strongly represented in the Liberation Tigers of Tamil Eelam.

=== Royal palanquin bearers ===
The palanquin bearers of Kingdom of Kandy were from patti division. They were also in charge of king's bath. King was preceded by them, when he went in state. Their duty, besides taking care of the bath, was to pour water on the king and those of the best families might touch him. They were also king's cowherds. John Davy classified them as Wiessia (Vaishya). Madras census report of 1891 notes of a Pondan “caste”. “These are the palanquin-bearers of the Zamorin. They are in dress, manners, customs, and language entirely Tamilians, and while the Zamorin is polluted by the touch of any ordinary Tamilian, these Pondans enjoy the privilege of bearing him in a palanquin to and from the temple every day. Now there is a sub-division of Idaiyans by name Pogondan, and I understand that these Pogondans are the palanquin-bearers of the Idaiyan caste. It seems probable that the founder or some early member of the Zamorin family obtained palanquin-bearers of his own caste and granted them, privileges which no other Tamilians now enjoy”. One should not take too much into such colonial characterisation of South Asian society in terms of purity and pollution. Proximity to King enabled the palace servants to wield enormous power. To alleviate potential thread to King, a caste, one which was small, politically unimportant and yet not of low status was chosen.

=== Use of palanquin ===
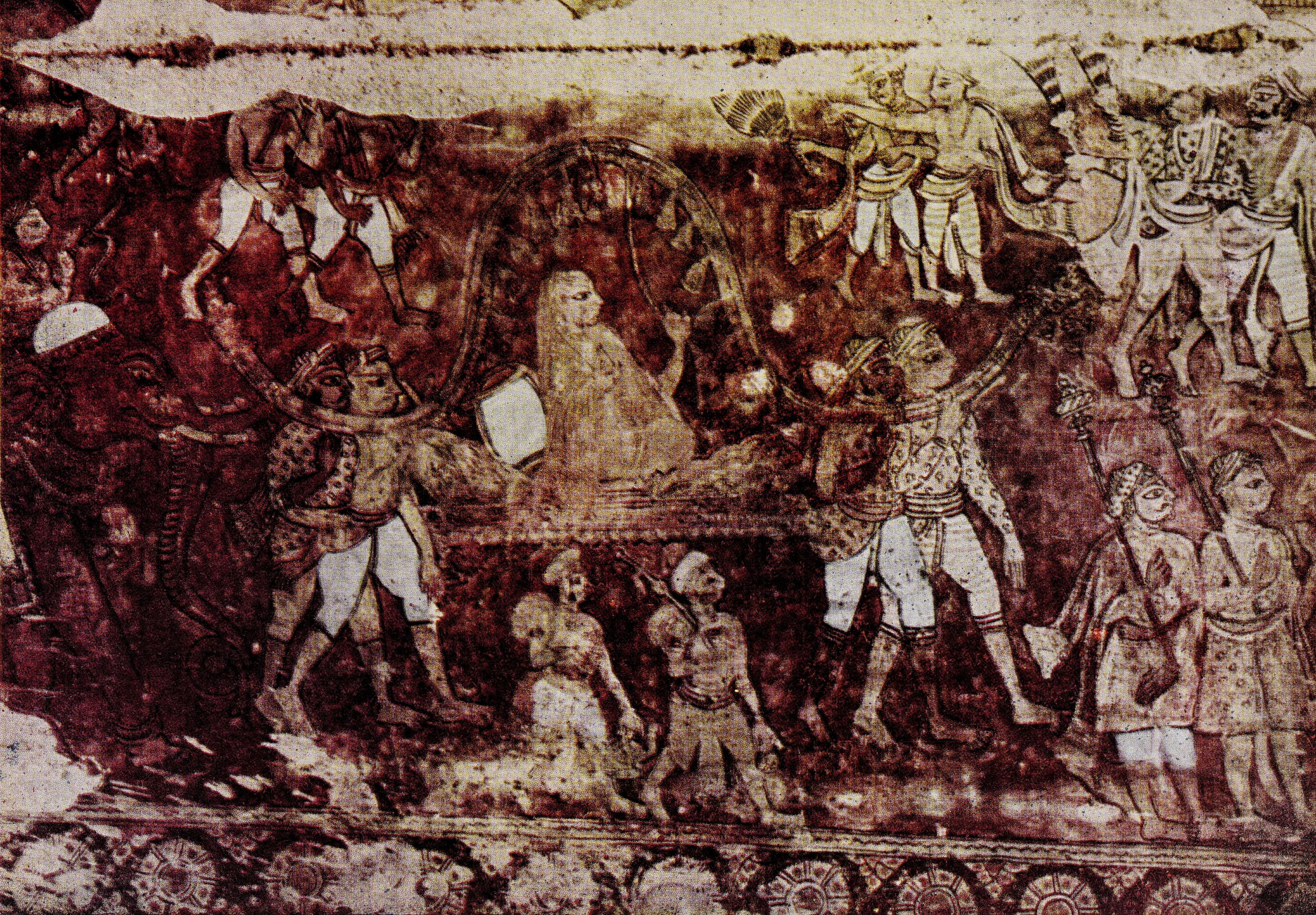
Vidyaranya taken in procession, Vijayanagara, Hampi, 15th century

Use of palanquins within the capital cities was restricted to Kings only. kings had the authority to grant permission to travel in a palanquin with bended pole as only Kings were entitled for it. In colonial period high officials continue to exercise this authority. Sir Thomas Maitland issued a warrant to the head brahmin entitling him to make use of a palanquin with a crooked bamboo, the highest that can be conferred on him. In early 19thcentury Jaffna, a man was flogged for the alleged crime of travelling in a palanquin. It was justified by a clause which rendered the headmen and other inhabitants liable to be imprisoned for causing themselves to be conveyed through the country in palanquins with a crooked pole except such as had permission from the Governors and commanders of Jaffna.

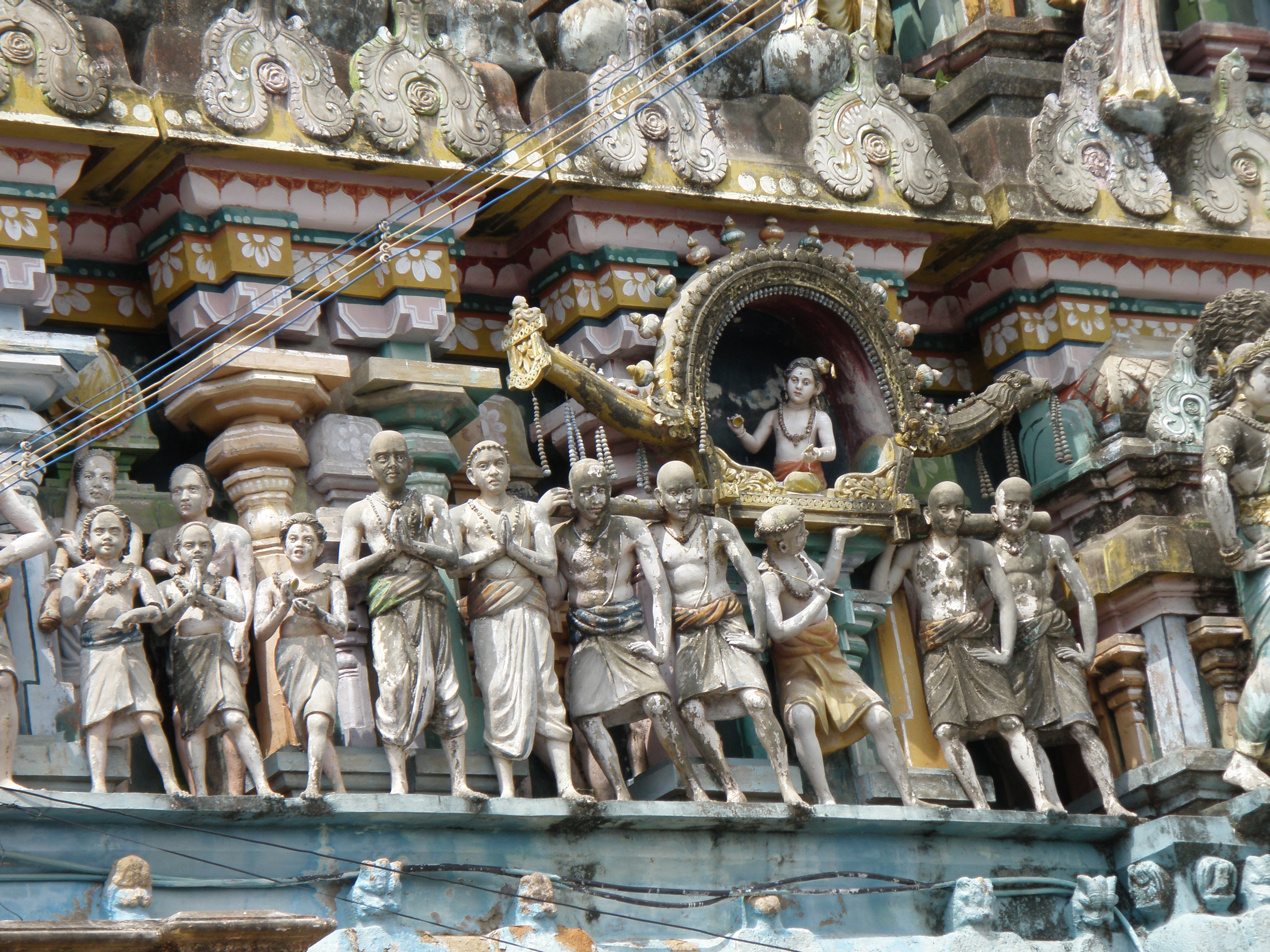
Amirthakadaieeshwarar temple relief depicting Appar bearing Thiru Gnaana Sambandar's palanquin

Palanquin bearing was considered as a privilege in olden days and not restricted to any particular caste. According to a legend when Govigama palanquin-bearers of the rulers in Kurunagala refused to render their hereditary raja-kariya because the new king was an arab lady's offspring, Prince Vattimi's arab advisers promised to bring brahmins, men of far better caste than the goyigama people, to take the place of the proud palanquin men. The medieval Telegu poet Allasani Peddana was borne in a palanquin by Emperor Krishnadevaraya. When king of Travancore went in public procession in his state palanquin his little son walked holding on by a corner of the royal palanquin for assistance. The Tanjore Maratha King Serfjoi II donated land, annual stipend of 50 gold coins and a palanquin to the vellala protestant convert Vedanayagam pillai, his former classmate and friend. The men who carried Vedanayagam pillai's palanquin, in order to maintain his ritual purity and the palanquin. would not allow their own shadows to cross the shadows of whatever 'alien' people of ceri they would encounter. There are references in Tamil literatures on vellalars who acted as palanquin bearers. The Saiva saint Appar carried the palanquin of saint Sambandar. Amirthakadaieeshwarar temple's tower sculpture depics Appar holding Sambandar's palanquin. The rest of the palanquin bearers seems to be brahmins.

=== colonialism and creation of castes ===
Nicholas B. Dirks, in his book title "Castes of Mind" detailed how under British domination caste became a single term capable of naming and above all subsuming India's diverse forms of social identity and organization. When European colonised South Asia, they employed many communities as palanquin bearers. Vellalars were forced to act as coolies and palanquin bearers during Portuguese time in Ceylon. Baldaeus noted inferior Dutch officers were carried by the coolies who are to be found all over the place in Jaffna. In colonial period, taking to palanquin bearing was a “simple question of wages and not a matter of caste or tradition”. The Siviyars of Tamil Nadu migrated from Mysore region to Tamil Nadu during the reign of Tipu Sultan. The name Siviyar was given to them by the Tamils. Many oriental writers started classifying palanquin bearers as a "caste". While many simply ignored the contradicting status in colonial records about palanquin bearers, Robert Percival reconciled the differences by making some of palanquin bearers as descended from "higher order". Simmon casi chetty, on the other hand, played with transliteration of Tamil words into English. Citing Constanzo Beschi's Sadur agaradi as his source, he classified the Vasiyas as Tan Vaisiyas or merchants, Poo Vaisiyars or husbandmen and Ko vaisiyas or herdsmen. He included Sivishar Ideiyer as one of the sub-divisions of Ko Vaisiyas. The proper name of this division is siviyar idaiyar as noted earlier. He also included Siviyar (palanquin bearers) as Sudras. He resolved his contradiction by changing the spelling of the siviyar sub-division of idaiyar caste as sivishar, though there is no such word in Tamil language.

== See also ==
- Caste system in Sri Lanka
