= Porowakara =

The Porowakara were a minority community of wood cutters from Sri Lanka. They were a part of the feudal land tenure system of Sri Lanka but eventually became absorbed into larger communities.

This community was classed as a sub-caste of the Govigama during the British period.

== See also ==
- Caste system in Sri Lanka
