= Cantar =

The cantar is a form of classical Spanish canción, song or poem.

- Cantar de mio Cid, "The Song of my Cid"
- Cantar de gesta, Spanish equivalent of the Old French medieval chanson de geste or "songs of heroic deeds"

== Other ==
- Cantar (album), a 1974 album by Gal Costa
- Cantar caste, a Tamil caste found in Sri Lanka
- Cantar, brand of French audio equipment maker Aaton
