= Patti caste =

Patti is a traditional caste of Herdsmen from Sri Lanka’s feudal past. They were a part of the feudal land tenure system and a sub-caste of the Govigama caste. Found in the highlands and the maritime provinces but now mostly merged into the Govigama caste.
