= Bathgama =

Bathgama is a Sri Lankan caste located predominantly in the Kandyan provinces, the traditional occupation of which was the cultivation of rice. Hence the name Bath (rice) and Gama (village) in the Sinhala language.

== Pre-history ==
There were Several different indigenous clans lived in the island during the Pre Vijaya era (before 505 BCE). These clans believed that four main clans are Yaksha, Naga, Dewa (people), and Raksha.

It is believed that these names were attributed metaphorically to indicate their profession. Yaksha tribe of people were believed to inhabit in the mountains where they had used monsoon wind to mould iron, Raksha people were supposed to be farmers who used the steel products of the yaksha tribe of people in their farming endeavors.

The name Raksha is derived from the two syllables Ra + Kus, in Sinhalese Kus means "stomach"; Rakus literally means the people who fulfill hunger or the people who provide rice, the staple food of the Sinhalese people. The Naga tribe of people were believed to be traders, the Deva tribe of people were the ruling, governance, military service, irrigation, trade, engineering, and agriculture.

As with most other occupational castes in Sri Lanka, the traditional occupation of Govigama and Bathgama was agriculture under Sri Lanka’s feudal land tenure system. Bathgama was in the tribe called Raksha in pre Vijayan history.

== Modern caste system with Kalinga Magha ==
Kulankayan Cinkai Ariyan (1215–1236) or popularly named as ‘Kalinga Maga’ is a South Indian invader who ruled the island for 21 years. The invasion historically important migration of Vellalar Nattar chiefs from the Coromandel Coast of South India who made a new social reorganization in Sinhalese society. They reorganizing villages on the basis of the Hindu caste principles other than Buddhist social system which introduced by Arahath Mahinda Thero in 3rd century BC. This reorganization was also connected with the development with the system of monarchy with absolute power. Thus the development of the monarchy and the development of caste principle during this time transformed Sri Lanka into social organization which was based on caste. Thus the well organized Sinhalese Buddhist community was transformed into caste based new hierarchy when the Kandyan Era. While Vellalar caste became the top of Tamil caste system the shadow of Vellalar, the Sinhalese Govigama caste became the top of Sinhalese society.

== Kandyan era ==
Konappu Bandara Appuhamy or *Vimaladharmasuriya I from Yatinuwara at Ededuwa village in Peradeniya who was established the Kandyan Kingdom. His father Weerasundra Bandara of non royal, flourishing Govigama caste member and his mother Kosgolle Gedara Wimalu from Bathgama Caste was served to the Rajasinhe 1 of Sithawaka as Dukgannarala or royal meal certifier. 1582 an army from Rajasinghe 1 attacked Kandy and King Karalliyadde (1552-1582 A.D.) fled to Manner with his family, seeking the protection of the Portuguese and appointed Weerasundara Badara to the post of ajudicator (Saamamtha).

But after a few days the king grew suspicious of Weerasundara Bandara, got him killed through subterfuge. Princess Kusumasana Devi daughter of King Karaliyadde, the heir to the Kandyan Kingdom as well as Yamasingha Bandara, a nephew of the King and Konappu Bandara, son of Weerasundara Bandara had fled to the Portuguese and lived under their protection.

At this point a Portuguese army was sent to Kandy under Konappu Bandara. The army captured Kandy very easily and made Yamasingha Bandara as the King of Kandy. He died after a few months and Konnapu Bandara was appointed himself as the King. Then he gave leadership and betrayed Portuguese and rebelled against them and made Kandyan Kingdom.

== British period ==
Bathgama community has escaped the British period consolidation of cultivator communities as the Govigama caste and exists as an independent but rather disenfranchised caste. Some writers have attempted to call it the “Palanquin bearer” caste. The late British period saw the proliferation of native headmen and a Mudaliyars class drawn from natives who were most likely to serve the British masters with utmost loyalty. (Mudaliyar is a South Indian and Tamil name for ‘first’ and a person endowed with wealth.) This class resembled English country squires, complete with large land grants by the British, residences of unprecedented scale (Referred to by the Tamil word Walauu or Walawoo) and British granted native titles.

The British Governor Arthur Hamilton Gordon (1883 – 1890) and his predecessors effectively used divide and rule policies and created caste animosity among the native elite and finally confined all Native Headmen appointments only to the Govigama caste. The British Government was advocating this as an effective policy for easy governance. Mahamudliar Louis De Saram’s family of Dutch and Malay ancestry had Sinhalised and Givigamised itself during the Dutch period and had a strong network of relatives as Mudaliyars by the late 19th century. This “Govigama” Anglican Christian network expanded further with the preponderance of native headmen as Mudaliyars, Korales and Vidanes from the Buddhist Govigama section of the community.

The creation of the above Mudaliyar class by the British in the 19th century, its restriction only to the Govigama caste, production of spurious caste hierarchy lists by this class and changes to the land tenure system, resulted in this caste too being classified as a low caste during this period. Although contrary to history, some modern Govigama historians even go to the extent to now suggest that this caste was traditionally bound to serve the Govi caste.

The influential Mudaliyar class attempted to keep this caste and all other Sri Lankan castes out of colonial appointments. They also used all possible means to economically and socially marginalise and subjugate all other communities. The oppression by the Mudaliars and connected headmen extended to demanding subservience, service, appropriation of cultivation rights and even restrictions on the type of personal names that could be used by this community.

== Post-independence period ==
Despite the above setbacks, several members of this caste are now successful entrepreneurs and are recognised as members of the local elite. They are gaining an increased say in modern Sri Lankan politics mainly through the alternative political party Janatha Vimukthi Peramuna as the leadership selection processes within the two main political parties are not democratic. Some scholars from Batagama community date back their presence in Sri Lanka to the time period of pre histiic King Ravanna period.Historically they have made fine soldiers and trusted body guards. Some common surnames such as " muthudarage" 'Hewapedige"'Rankothpedige""Wagasenevige" shows their relevance to military services and some of these surnames dates back to aking adutugemunu era. Even at present Bathgama people together With *Dewa (people) make up most of the bodyguards for political leaders. Due to marginalisation from mainstream Sinhala Buddhist society there are significant numbers of Christian converts since the colonial period, as conversion provided much easier access to good education and government jobs. Nonetheless, the vast majority of Bathgama people are Buddhists and a large number of prominent Buddhist monks of the "Ramagna" and "Amarapura" sects are from Bathgama Caste.

== A few prominent members of the Bathgama community ==
- N. H. Keerthiratne – former Cabinet Minister of Posts and Broadcasting
- Asoka Karunaratne – former Cabinet Minister of Social Services
- Patali Champika Ranawaka – Sri Lankan politician
- Charles Godakumbura – archeologist
- Mahindananda Aluthgamage – cabinet minister
- Neranjan Wickremasinghe – former Provincial Minister of North Western Province, SLFP chief organizer of Mawathagama and former member of Parliament
- Lalith Dissanayake – deputy minister of health and former Health Minister of Sabaragamuwa Province
- Chandra Karunaratne – former non-cabinet minister & M.P. for Nawalapitiya
- U. P. Y. Jinadasa – former parliamentarian
- Cyril Wickremage – artist and actor
- Susanthika Jayasinghe – Olympic silver medalist
- Bandula Warnapura – first Sri Lankan test cricket captain
- Chandralekha Perera – singer
