= Colebrooke–Cameron Commission =

British Roysl Commission to assess the administration of the island of Ceylon

The Colebrooke–Cameron Commission was appointed in 1833 as a Royal Commission of Eastern Inquiry by the British Colonial Office to assess the administration of the island of Ceylon and to make recommendations for administrative, financial, economic, and judicial reform. According to Sir Charles Jeffries' book, Ceylon - The Path to Independence, "by the time the Commission got round to Ceylon, in 1829, most of the members had fallen by the wayside, and only one, Major (afterwards Sir William) Colebrooke was left."

After the conquest of the Kandyan kingdom by the British in 1815, the entire country had become a colony of the British Empire. By year 1828, the government expenditure of the country had rapidly exceeded government revenue due to several reasons such as carrying out the administration of the country by dividing it into two parts, the upcountry and the low country, and having to incur a huge expenditure on paying salaries to government officers from Britain and also for providing the necessary facilities to them. The government of Britain had to cover up expenses itself. Therefore the Colonial Secretary appointed a special commission to come to Ceylon and examine the situation and to make necessary recommendations.

The commission comprised William MacBean George Colebrooke and Charles Hay Cameron. Cameron was in charge of investigating the judicial system. The legal and economic proposals made by the commission in 1833 were innovative and radical. Some of the proposals were adopted. They signified for Ceylon the first manifestation of constitutional government, the first steps toward modernising the traditional economic system, and the beginnings of a uniform system of justice, education, and civil administration.

== Recommendations ==
- Establishment of an Executive Council and Legislative Council
- The amalgamation of the Kandyan and Maritime provinces and their administration as a single unit of government by the Governor in Council.
- The admission of Ceylonese into the Ceylon Civil Service.
- The abolition of 'Rājākariya' – compulsory personal service in the Kandyan provinces.
- A commission to manage education should be appointed
- A principal public school on the British model should be established for English education and teacher training.

== Outcomes ==
- The Executive Council of Ceylon and the Legislative Council of Ceylon was established, later becoming the foundation of representative legislature in the country.
- Form of the modern central government was established for the first time in the island, followed by the gradual decline of local form of feudalism including 'rājākariya', which was abolished soon after.
- Modernising the economic system.
- Education was taken over by the government from the church.
- Establishment of the Colombo Academy as the principal public school in the island.

=== Protests launched by Ceylonese ===
After the Colebrooke reforms of 1833 had been implemented, the Europeans who lived in the country launched protests demanding that certain reforms should be made to the Colebrooke constitution. These Europeans were the rich people who had come to Ceylon for planting crops and had engaged in plantation in the upcountry areas. By that time there had arisen the need for them to get the required funds allocated by the Legislative for developing the road system, postal and other services and facilities where their plantations were located. Three unofficial members had been appointed to the council represent these Europeans. However, they launched protests as the number of official members in the council was greater than the unofficial members and the Council had not been granted sufficient powers. In order to carry out these protests, they formed "Planters' Association of Ceylon" in 1856. Two prominent leaders of this association were William Digby and George Wall.

At the beginning of the 20th Century, the middle class launched protests demanding constitutional reforms too. Out of the educated middle class who led the protests at the early stage, Ponnambalam Ramanathan, Ponnambalam Arunachalam, Sir James Peiris and H. G. C. Perera were prominent. Low Country Products Association of Ceylon, Chillaw Association and Jaffna Association were some of the leading associations that were formed by the middle class. It was Sir James Peiris who first submitted a formal memorandum to the Colonial Secretary in 1909 explaining the need for constitutional reforms. After that, several other petitions were submitted by various groups. Some of the reforms proposed are,

- increasing the number of unofficial members in the Council
- electing representatives to the legislative, and
- abolishing the communal representation system (since it led to various controversies between various ethnic groups in the country.)

== See also ==
- Executive Council of Ceylon
- Legislative Council of Ceylon
- Ceylon Civil Service
- Colombo Academy
- Charles Jeffries, Ceylon - The Path to Independence, Pall Mall Press, London, 1962, p. 24.
