= Bodhivansha caste =

Caste in Sri Lanka

Bodhi Vamsa or Bodhahara is a caste in Sri Lanka. Originally, members were appointed as guardians of the Sri Maha Bodhi tree.

== History ==
The caste traces its origin to the arrival of the Sri Maha Bodhi Tree in Sri Lanka. Dipavamsa, the earliest document of the history of Sri Lanka, states that the following persons came to the island with or associated with Sri Mahabodhi.

1. Eight Kshatriya who were entrusted with protecting the Bodhi Tree
2. Bodhiguptha and Chandraguptha
3. Sixteen Lanka Mahalekhas (Lambakarnas)
4. Castes (or families) that received golden drums used for royal coronations (Lambakarnas)

The Mahavamsa records state that during the reign of King Parakramabahu I, three lambakarnas (or mahalekha), were sent to southern India for a coronation festival. Accordingly, they are either descendants of Bodhiguptha, Chandragupta, eight kshatriyas or from the gotra lambakarnas. Mahavamsa itself contains a narrative of this incident which is less credible than Dipavamsa. It states that eighteen families of gods, eighteen families of ministers, eight families of Brahmins, eight families of kelembi etc. have been sent from India. However, only a certain "eight situ families are specifically mentioned as Bodahara Caste". According to later sources, these situ clans are Bodhiguptha, Chandragupta, Samudragupta, Sumitta, Devagupta, Sooryagupta, Dharmagupta, and Juthindara, relatives of King Dharmashoka. It was commonly believed that the members of this caste were descendants of this clan (in particular, Bodhiguptha), and are also connected to the lambakarnas

== Connection with Sinhalese royalty ==
Many Sinhalese royals prior to the Kandyan era claimed descent from the families that accompanied the Sri Maha Bodhi. For example, Kawyashekaraya, a Kotte era literary source mentions:

මහබෝ රකින ලෙස සැලසු බෝ කලක්‌ වැස එමහ බෝ අබියස විසූ කුලයන් මෙලක මුල් බැස

සිරි සඟබෝ නිරිඳු විකුම් වැඩි මහසෙන් රදු කිත්සිරි මේ නිරිඳු බුජස්‌ මහනම කුමර දස්‌ රඳු

The above two verses refer to castes that were entrusted to protect the Bodhi tree establishing roots in the country and producing kings like Sirisangabo, Mahasen, Kithsiri mewan, Buddhdasa, Mahanama, and Kumaradasa. However, due to the absence of direct descendants who claim to be of this caste, it is difficult to prove that this is the same royal clan that lost power by the 17th century.

The following provides further evidence for royal lineage:

- The term "pannadura" literally means officials assigned with temples, or pannasala. In historical sources similar officials are referred to as aramikas and inscriptions as veherkami. The Mahavamsa historical chronicle states that King Aggabodhi I assigned a hundred of his relatives to be aramikas.
- Some of the people belonging to this caste still attend to the duties assigned to the Jaya Sri Maha Bodhi holy tree to this day. The head of the clan attending to Sri Maha Bodhi is known as mahaya, which is the old term used to denote the next in line to the kinship of country.
- The Mehenavara clan (descendants of prince bodhiguptha) were the last line of traditional kings that ruled from Kandy. Descendants of the Mehenavara clan appear to have survived in the village of Mawela in Kotmale (Kobbekaduwa copper plate-given to Mehenavara Mawela Ratnavalli by king Sena Sammatha Vikramabahu of the same clan), which is the village associated with King Dutugemunu. Members of this caste and Nekathi caste live in Mawela to this day. According to one legend, King Dutugemunu lived in Mawela in a house belonging to a person of this caste.
- Village of origin of Jothiya Situ, ruler of Kandyan provinces during the reign of king Parakramabahu VI, and also known as Divanawatte Lankadikara (Madawala inscription) belonged to this caste.

== Colonial period ==
Since the 17th century, the status of the Bodhivansha caste gradually declined as a result of social changes taken place due to western colonial influence. Throughout the colonial period, particularly during the British colonial era, it was portrayed as several disconnected castes with names such as pannadura, villidura, and dura that were not in use prior to the 17th century. Jobs like grass cutting have been proposed by various writers without referring to historical and literary sources like the Dipavamsa, Mahavamsa, or Pujavaliya. During this time of decline, they functioned mainly as soldiers, with some holding high ranks. Their military capability is visible even after the collapse of Kandyan kingdom, as they actively supported rebellions of 1818, 1834, and 1848. They also functioned as royal officers attached to various departments like the Kuruwe (elephant men), royal stables, and prisons. Some cared for the royal cattle shed and others held posts as mananna, or grain measurers, of the royal storehouses. Several others lived in royal villages of the type Bisogam (Queens villages), Gabadagam (kings own villages) and especially Vihara/devala gam (Temple villages). As a result, Disputes are still in place between villagers and leading Buddhist institutions. Samarakkodi, second Adigar of King Kirti Sri Rajasinha, who was instrumental in re-establishing Buddhism in Sri Lanka is a high-ranking officer from this caste.

== Notable members ==
- Ihagama Unnanse (also known as Ihagama Babasa), leader of 1816, 1818, and 1834 rebellions to oust the British
- Puran Appu (leader of the 1848 rebellion)
- Ven. Harispattuwe ariyawanshalankara thero
