= Govigama =

Agrarian Sinhala caste found in Sri Lanka

Govigama (also known as Goyigama, Govikula, Govi Vansa or Goyi Vansa) is a Sinhalese caste found in Sri Lanka. They form approximately half of the Sinhalese population and are traditionally involved in agriculture. The term Govigama became popular during the last period of the Sinhalese Kingdom of Kandy. Its members have dominated and influenced national politics and Sinhalese Buddhism (particularly the Siam Nikaya sect).

Geographically Govigama is concentrated in the regions of Kandy, Colombo and other areas of low country. These Govi and the Bathgama have traditionally been responsible for cultivation in accordance with the traditional tenure system of land-holding known as Rājākariya, where the king granted land in exchange for services rendered. The Govigama caste has several endogamous subdivisions which include the Radalas (Kandyan aristocracy), Rate atto (husbandmen), Patti (shepherds), Katupulle (messengers or clerks), Nilamakkara (temple servants), Porovakara (wood cutters), Vahal (Radala servants) and Gattara (Govigama outcaste).

== Etymology ==
The caste name is occupational derived. Govigama is derived from the Sinhala word Goyigama meaning farm-land, in reference to their traditional occupation as farmers and land owners. Early Sinhalese texts such as the 13th century Pujavaliya mention a caste system of the Sinhalese society; the Raja (rulers), Bamunu (Brahmins), Velanda (traders) and the Govi (Farmers). being the forward castes.

The appellation Govi is probably derived from the Prakritic Gahapati which literally means 'householder'. We find in the 13th century Saddharma-Ratnāvaliya of Dharmasena Thero, the Pali term gahapati being rendered as Govi gahapatika or Govi kulehi upan tänättō. Gahapati occurs in ancient Pali literature as the third ranking caste after the Khattiya and Brāhmaṇa and appears to have been synonymous with the Vessakula i.e. Vaiśya.

When it comes to the present day, it appears that the Govigama caste has transformed into a compound caste made out of all castes mentioned in Saddharma-Ratnāvaliya (raja, bamunu, velanda and govi) consisting of four sub-castes, Radalavaru (Governing elite), Mudaliperuwa (Knighted elite), Rate aththo (officers of state), and Goviyo (farmers). The caste hierarchy with Govigama at the forefront has been justified through historical sources from the perspective of Ancestry. The Karava, Durava and Salagama people, who were of Dravidian origin, arrived to the coastal regions of the Island after the 13th Century. The original Sinhalese who lived in the Island before the 13th Century are represented by Up-Country castes consisting of the Govigama and also other Central region castes. Within the Sinhalese caste system the older pre-13th Century castes are ranked at a higher level while the post-13th Century later arrivals of South Indian Dravidian origin such as the Karava, Durava and Salagama are ranked lower.

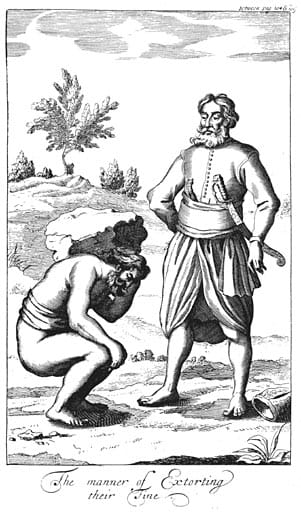
An 18th-century illustration of a Hondrew (goyigama) officer of the kandyan king supervising a man extoring a fine, from An Historical Relation of the Island Ceylon by Robert Knox (1641–1720)

== History ==
=== Ancient period ===
Ancient texts such as the Pujavaliya, Sadharmaratnavaliya and Yogaratnakaraya list the four major classes as Raja, Bamunu, Velanda, and Govi.

=== Kandyan period ===
For the past 1,700 years the only undisputed symbol of Sri Lankan royalty and leadership has been the sacred Tooth Relic of Gautama Buddha. Whosoever possessed this was acknowledged as the rightful ruler of Lanka, and thus the Tooth Relic was a possession exclusive to the ruling dynasty of Sri Lanka. Upon each change of capital, a new palace was built to enshrine the Relic. Finally, in 1595 it was brought to Kandy where it is at present, in the Temple of the Tooth. However, even in the land-locked Kandyan kingdom 'Unambuwe' a son of a concubine of some considerable background was deemed not of 'royalty', hence a Tamil of royalty with Telugu origin was imported from Madurai. This last Kandyan royal dynasty (four kings) of Nayake origin was from the Balija caste Even King Senarat Adahasin's regent, Antonio Baretto Kuruvita Rala, Prince of Ouva, was not from the Govi cast.

The oldest Buddhist sect in Sri Lanka, the Siam Nikaya (established on 19 July 1753) are the custodians of the Tooth Relic, since its establishment during the Kandyan Kingdom. The Siam Nikaya uses caste-based divisions, and as of 1764 grants higher ordination only to the Govigama caste, excluding other castes from its numbers, Sitinamaluwe Dhammajoti (Durawa) was the last non-Govigama monk to receive upasampada. This conspiracy festered within the Siam Nikaya itself and Moratota Dhammakkandha, Mahanayaka of Kandy, with the help of the last two Kandyan Tamil Kings victimised the low-country Mahanayaka Karatota Dhammaranma by confiscating the Sri Pada shrine and the retinue villages from the low country fraternity and appointing a rival Mahanayaka

=== Current political power ===
Non–Govigama representation in Parliament has steadily declined since independence and representation of non-Govigama castes are well below their population percentages. Caste representation in the Cabinet has always been limited to a few very visible, but unconcerned and disconnected members from other castes.

== Customs ==
=== Occupation ===
The Govigama are a landowning caste. The Sinhalese caste system was based on the service to the king or 'raja kariya', and land ownership. The Govigama people had the right to cultivate and use the lands of the Sinhalese Kingdom at the behest of Sinhalese King. Their contribution to rice production, leadership in Buddhism and service in royal service gave Govigama people the foremost role in the ancient agrarian society in Sri Lanka. Kings are said to have participated in harvesting festivals held end of each Yala (dry) and Maha (wet) season.

In the present era, it has been a norm that the head of the country should be a Govigama caste member, though President Premadasa was not. Colonial occupiers, including the Portuguese, Dutch and British, tried to change Govigama dominance by giving prominence to other castes by granting government posts and education under them. However they were unable to change the caste hierarchy in traditional Sinhalese society. The Dutch and the British introduced the ideas of Republicanism.

=== Names ===
An important characteristic in the Sinhalese caste system is that the family name or the surname details the ancestry. The original name was given based on where one lived. Later, honorary terms, granted by the king based on a person's service to the kingdom, were added to the original name. This continued for generations and resulted in very long names. In General, Disawe, Mudiyanse, Adikari, Mahalekam, Appuhamy, Imiya raala, Nawaratne, Jayathilaka, Gunathilaka, Jayawardana, Wijayawardhana, Wijeyasundara, Udugampola, Gunawardhana, Siriwardhana, Abeywardhana, Abeysiriwardhana, Abeygunawardhana, Dharmawardhana, Dissanayake, Ekanayake, Gajanayaka, Kulatunga, Liyanage, Madawala, Rathnasinghe, Ranasinghe, Wijesinghe, Dunusinghe, Wickramasinghe, Rajapaksha, Molamure, Meedeniya, Kiriella, Herath, Yapa, Rekawa, Widanapathirana, Balasooriya, Iddamalgoda, Ganegoda, Kodagoda, Arachchi, Vidhane are considered to be names taken up by Govigama people, and these names were extended according to the ranking in the service of the kingdom. Further variations exist due to changes during the colonial period. Historic literature and inscriptional evidence from the feudal period show that this hierarchy prevailed throughout the feudal period until the collapse of Sri Lankan kingdoms and social structure under the onslaught of European colonialism. However, even in the present day, Sinhalese people look at surnames and ancestry when it comes to marriages.

As for name and religious conversions, Govigama families too became Christian and had Portuguese/Christian names (some strangely adopted during British/Dutch times) such as Don Davith (Rajapaksas), Barthlamew (Senanayakes), Ridgeway Dias (Nilaperumal/Bandaranaykes), Pererala, Arnolis Dep (Wijewardane), Corea, Ilangakoon, de Saa Bandaranaike, Obeyesekere, de Saram, Don Johannes Padmawansha (Kumarage), de Alwis, etc. It is also why all elite Sri Lankans of the British period be it farmer or other wise had English first names. The English first names were common among many not necessarily associated to Govigama. Some of the Goyigama such as the Bandaranayake also were pioneer arrack renters of the colonial era among many other castes.

=== Social status ===
In traditional Sinhalese society Buddhist monks are placed at the top. Irrespective of the birth caste of a monk, even the king had to worship him. However, this led to some Buddhist sects in Sri Lanka allowing only Govigama people to join, contrary to Buddha's instructions. Other castes such as Karava, Durava, Salagama and Wahumpura have their own Buddhist sects. The Govigama sect also known as the Mahavihara Wanshika Siyam Order hold the custody of Sri Dalada Maligawa (The temple of the tooth) and the sacred tooth relic of Buddha.

== Notable people ==
- Nicholas Dias Abeyesinghe Amarasekere – Maha Mudaliar of Dutch Ceylon
- E. R. Gooneratne – Acting Maha Mudaliar and literary figure
- John Kotelawala – Prime Minister of Ceylon
- Wijeyananda Dahanayake – Prime Minister of Ceylon
- Nissanka Wijeyeratne – Diyawadana Nilame and Cabinet Minister
- Gamini Dissanayake – Cabinet Minister, MP & Presidential candidate
- Anura Kumara Dissanayake - 9th Executive President of Sri Lanka & Leader of National People's Power
- Ruwan Wijewardene – State Minister, MP
- Sri Lankabhimanya Dingiri Banda Wijetunga - 4th Executive President of Sri Lanka

== See also ==
- Radala
- Koviyar
- Sri Lankan Mudaliyars
- Patti caste
- Sinhalisation
- Caste system in Sri Lanka

== Bibliography ==
- Abhayawardena H. A. P. Kadaim Poth Vimarshanaya, Ministry of Cultural Affairs, Sri Lanka
- H. W. Codrington, Ancient land tenure and revenue in Ceylon
- Darmapradeepikava Sri Dharmarama edition, 1951
- Epigraphia Zeylanica (EZ) Colombo Museum, Sri Lanka
- Gammaduwa, Ministry of Cultural Affairs, Sri Lanka
- Jayathilake D. B. Dambadeni Asna saha Kandavuru Siritha
- Jayawardena, Kumari (2000). "Nobodies to Somebodies – The Rise of the Colonial Bourgeoisie in Sri Lanka". hindu.com. Archived from the original on 30 September 2007.
- Journal of Asian Studies 1990 Articles by Patrick Peebles, Amita Shastri, Bryan Pfaffenberger
- Journal of the Royal Asiatic Society of Sri Lanka (JRASCB)
- Kumaratunga Munidasa 1958 Parevi Sandeshaya
- Niti Nighanduva The vocabulary of law 1880 LeMasurier C. J. R. and Panabokke T. B.
- Peebles Patrick 1995 Social Change in Nineteenth Century Ceylon Navrang ISBN 81-7013-141-3.
- Pfaffenberger Bryan 1982 Sudra Domination in Sri Lanka Syracuse University
- Pujavaliya
- Roberts Michael Caste conflict and elite formation
- Sahithyaya 1972 Department of Cultural Affairs, Sri Lanka
- Sarpavedakama Colombo Museum publication, 1956
- Sri Lankáve Ithihásaya Educational Publications Department Sri Lanka
- Ummagga Játhakaya 1978 edition Educational Publications Department, Sri Lanka
- Wickramasinghe Nira 2001 Civil Society in Sri Lanka: New circles of power
