= Berava (caste) =

Social group or caste in Sri Lanka

Berava are a social group or caste amongst the Sinhalese of Sri Lanka. Like the Paraiyar of the neighboring Tamil ethnic group in Sri Lanka as well as Tamil Nadu state in South India, they were segregated from the mainstream society, yet played and still play an important and vital role in the religious rituals of the mainstream community. In Maharashtra the Berava belongs to maratha(Kshatriya)

== Origins ==
As the mainstream Sinhalese speakers claim North Indian ethnic origins the presence of many South Indian type Jatis like the Beravas indicate a complex migration history from India to Sri Lanka. Beravas do not indicate any tribal origins like the other formerly untouchable caste of Rodiyas. They are part and parcel of the caste structure albeit with a primary function associated with Tom Tom or drum besting in all ritual occasions. Yet they are also used as agricultural workers, weavers and domestic help throughout the country.

=== South Indian roots ===
Some anthropologists believe that the early society of Sri Lanka has looked to neighboring South India for manpower to fulfill functional needs as land was cleared and many new villages found. Berava are believed to be descended from Paraiyar like caste of South India who also play an important role in Tom Tom or Drum or Bera beating

=== Colonial period ===
The powerful Mudaliyar class created by the British in the 19th century attempted to keep this caste and all other Sri Lankan castes out of colonial appointments. They also used all possible means to economically and socially marginalise and subjugate all other communities. The oppression by the Mudaliars and connected headmen extended to demanding subservience, service, appropriation of cultivation rights and even restrictions on the type of personal names that could be used by this community. Continuous oppression and prejudices created by the Buddhist monastic establishment has made it difficult for this community to progress.

== Etymology of Bera ==
The etymology of the word Berava is ultimately the Sinhala word 'Bera' meaning drum. The word inturn derives from Sanskrit Bherī (भेरी), meaning "kettle-drum".

== Sub divisions ==
There are many subdivisions within the caste, some of which are Badgam Berava and Gahala Berava indicating drumming specializations. They denote Temple drummers who occupied and cultivated Bathgam (rice producing villages) as tenant farmers and Executioner's drummers respectively. It may indicate diverse origins for this caste as for all castes in India.

== Role in folk religion ==
Although great many Sinhalese purport to profess the conservative Theravada Buddhism there is a thriving belief in demons, spirits, Hindu gods and connected rituals such as spirit possession, cursing ceremonies throughout the country also referred as the Spirit Religion or Folk Tradition. Some of these are facilitated by shamans, sorcerers, and native priests and astrologers. Berava perform the needed role as sorceress in some villages and also gain respectability by building cultic shrines to attract devotees from other castes.
