= Thimilar =

Sri Lankan Tamil caste

- Religions: Christianity, Hinduism
- Languages: Tamil
- Related groups: Tamils, Sri Lankan Tamils

Thimilar (Tamil: திமிலர்) is a Sri Lankan Tamil caste found in the northern and eastern coastal areas of Sri Lanka, and globally among the Tamil diaspora. They are traditional artisanal fishers primarily engaged in shallow-water fishing. In Eastern Sri Lanka are they also involved in cattle cultivation.

Historically, they have also been known as Sindhu nāttar (people of Sindh), following their own myth origins.

== Etymology ==
The word Thimilar is derived from the word thimil, a Tamil word for boat, and the honorific suffix -ar, thus Thimilar is literally translated as Boatmen. The Akanaṉūṟu of the Sangam literature, mentions Thimilan, as a boat using fisherman.

== History ==
The Vaiyapadal mentions the Sindhu Natar, a name of the Thimilar, as one of the communities inhabiting the Jaffna Peninsula. They are mentioned in the Mattakallappu Manmiyam as one of the fishing tribes living in the eastern part of Sri Lanka, who lost a battle to the Mukkuvar who were in alliance with the Pathans. Place names in the Batticaloa region are derived from the battle such as Sathurukondan (meaning "were enemy was killed", referring to the execution of the Thimilar chief) and Pathiyai-thookia-palai (where the Thimilar chieftess was hanged).

== See also ==
- Caste system in Sri Lanka
- Paravar
