= Kandyan Provinces =

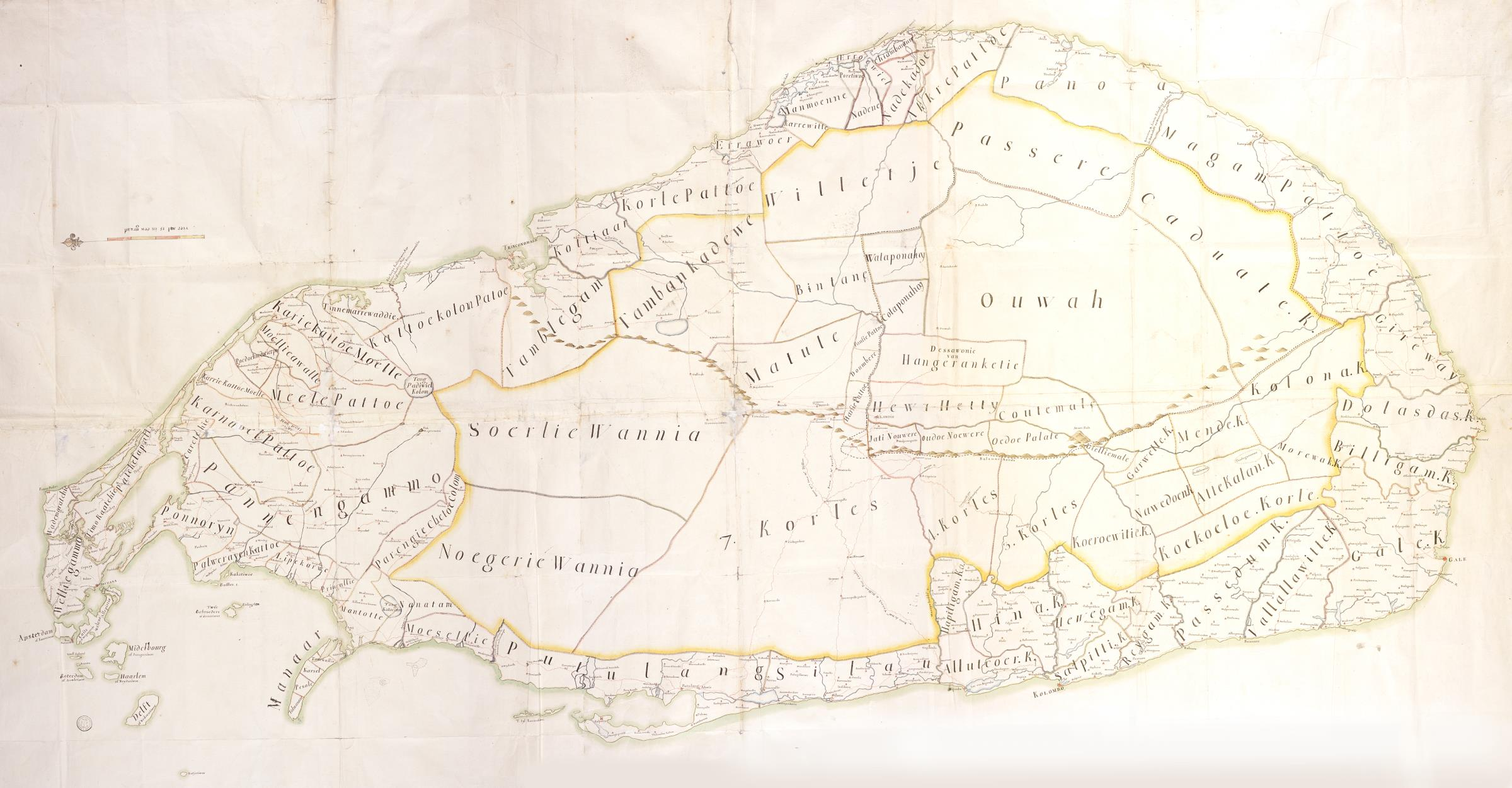
Map of Ceylon, divided into districts between 1700 and 1800.

The Kandyan Provinces was an administrative region of British Ceylon from 2 March 1815 to 1 October 1833, which consisted of the provinces and districts of the former Kingdom of Kandy which was ceding to the British Crown by the Kandyan Convention.

== Administration ==
In April 1815, the Kandyan Provinces were divided into five divisions and administered by a board that was made up of a Resident, a Judicial Commissioner, a Revenue Commissioner and Commanding Officer of the Troops in the interior (after 1819). This board with the Adigars and principal chiefs formed what was called the Great Court of Justice (Maha Naduwe) with appeal only possible to Governor. The Dissavas continued to exercise civil authority. Sir John D'Oyly, 1st Baronet, of Kandy served as Resident from 1815 to till his death in 1824, at which point the office of Resident was abolished. Following the Great Rebellion of 1817–1818, administrative changes were enacted by the Proclamation on 21 November 1818, delegating the executive and judicial authority in the Kandyan Provinces to the Board of Commissioners and under their superintendence to the Resident Agents to the Government in the Dissavanis with native chiefs reporting to them with both administrative and judicial powers.

The Colebrooke–Cameron Commission brought the Kandian Provinces and the Maritime Provinces under an administrative system of a unified territory for the whole island. The reforms divided the colony into five provinces, with each province further subdivided into four or five districts on 1 October 1833.

== Divisions ==
Divisions in the Kandyan Provinces were defined in the Proclamation as:

1. Four Korales
2. Matale
3. Udapalata (including Upper Bulathgama)
4. Udunuwara
5. Yatinuwara
6. Thumpane
7. Harispattuva
8. Dumbara
9. Hevaheta
10. Kothmale
11. Walapane
12. Hurulu, Tamarawewa, Maminiya and Ulugalla
13. Uva
14. Wellassa
15. Bintenna
16. Wiyaluwa
17. Royal village of Madulla
18. Seven Korales
19. Northern and western parts of Nuwarakalawiya
20. Sabaragamuva
21. Three Korales
22. Tamankaduwa

The Government Almanac of 1832, gives the districts of the Kandyan Provinces as:

1. Uva and Bintenna
2. Sabaragamuva
3. Seven Korales and north part of Nuwarakalawiya
4. Three Korales
5. Tamankaduwa
6. Kandy
7. Four Korales
8. Matale and east part of Nuwarakalawiya
9. Harispattuva and Thumpane
10. Hewaheta south of Maha-oya and Walapane
11. Lower Uva and Wellassa

== Legal impact ==
Even after Kandian Provinces ceased to exist as an administrative entity, the area that it once consisted of were subjected to in laws that came into effect after 1833 such as the Crown Lands Ordinance and existing laws that has been practiced in these lands before 1815 such as the Kandyan law.
