= Maritime Provinces (Ceylon) =

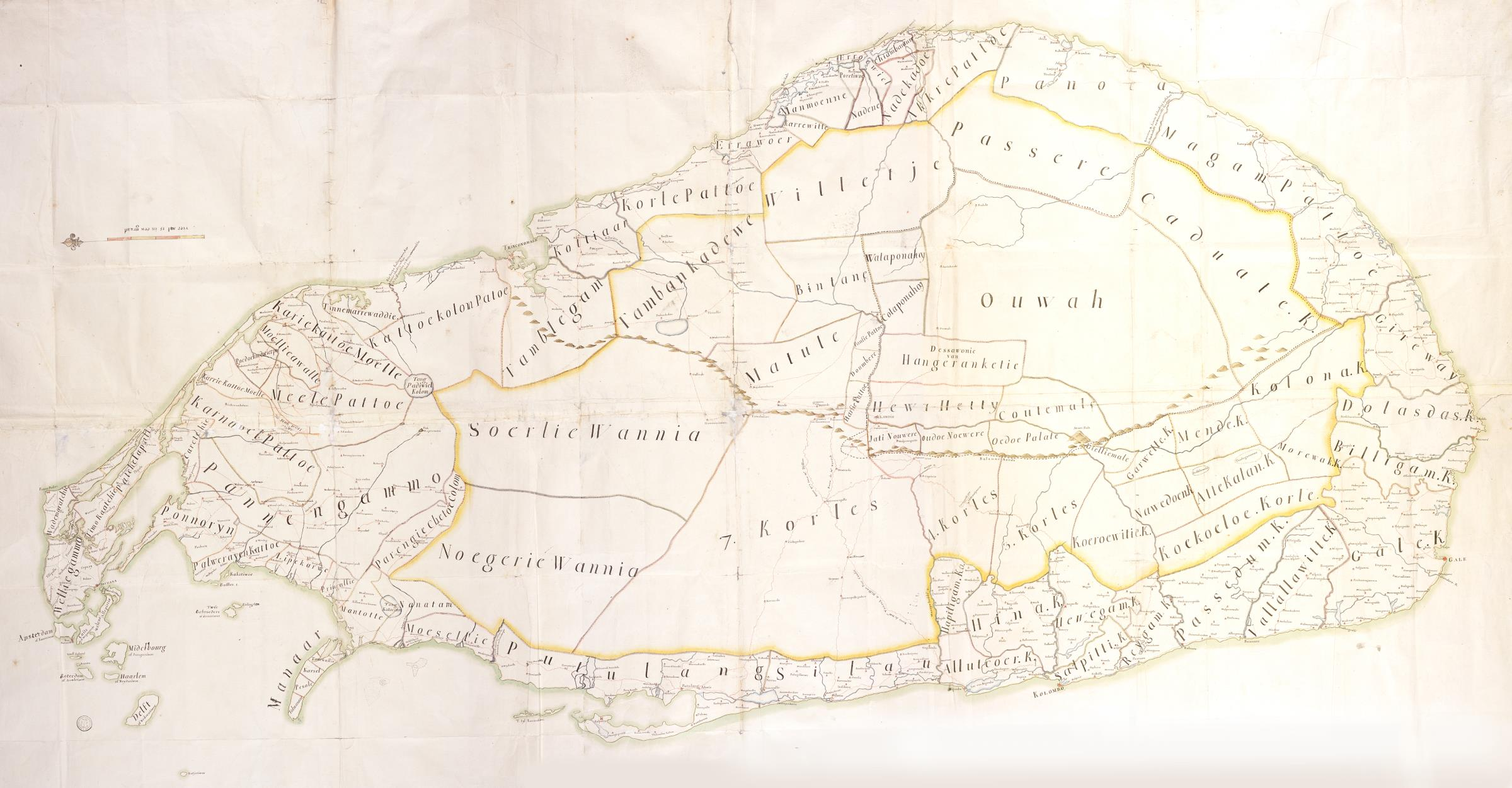
Map of Ceylon, divided into districts between 1700 and 1800.

The Maritime Provinces was an administrative region of British Ceylon from 15 February 1796 to 1 October 1833, which consisted of the maritime districts of the former Dutch Governorate of Ceylon, which was ceded to the British following the Invasion of Ceylon.

The Colebrooke–Cameron Commission brought the Kandyan Provinces and the Maritime Provinces under an administrative system of a unified territory for the whole island. The reforms divided the colony into five provinces, with each province further subdivided into four or five districts on 1 October 1833.

== Districts ==
The 1766 Treaty between the King of Kandy and Dutch East India Company, defined the boundaries of the Maritime Provinces:

1. Yapapattanama (Jaffna)
2. Hettikulapattuwa (Chettikulam)
3. Mannarama (Mannar)
4. Kolamba Disawa (Colombo)
5. Galu Korale (Galle)
6. Puliyanduwa (Batticaloa)
7. Trikunamale (Trincomalee)
