= Cantar caste =

Santar (also spelled Shandar or Sandar, they are also known as Shanar and Shandrar, and சாண்டார் in Tamil) is a Tamil caste found in Sri Lanka. They are traditionally occupied in Oil-pressing and cultivation.

== Etymology ==
The Cantars are also known as Shanar. The term is proposed as an etymologically corruptive derivative of shandrar, the older term for the community.

== History ==
They were originally tree-climbers and toddy tappers. They claim origin from the Shanars of South India, who settled in Sri Lanka, initially in the Puttalam region, due to social clashes and overpopulation in South India.

The Jaffna Kingdom were known for exporting elephants, which were caught in the Vanni region and maintained by the Cantars. The Cantars had to pay taxes to the Jaffna kings for producing jaggery and pinattu (a sweet or pulp, made of dried palmyra fruit).

The Cantars have in recent centuries taken to oil milling, specializing in gingelly oil.

== See also ==
- Nadar
