= Genetic studies on Sinhalese =

DNA analysis of Sinhalese populations

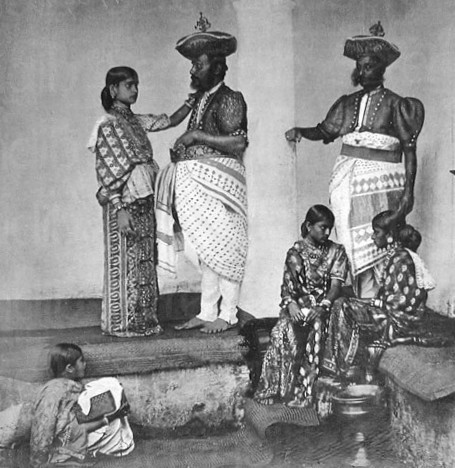
Sinhalese family in 1880

Genetic studies on the Sinhalese are part of population genetics investigating the ancestral origins of the Sinhalese people. A 2025 study utilizing whole genome sequencing has shown that the Sinhalese exhibit a close genetic proximity to South Indian populations and other groups within Sri Lanka, such as Sri Lankan Tamils and the Vedda. Modern genomic analysis suggests that the genetic contribution from Western Indian (Maratha) sources is more rooted than that from North Indian populations, though shared ancestral components exist across the broader South Asian subcontinent.

== Relationship to Bengalis ==
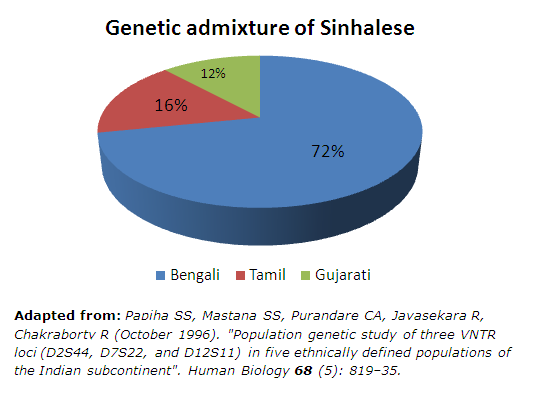
genetic admixture of Sinhalese by Papiha et al. (1996)

An Alu polymorphism analysis by Mastana S (2007) using Sinhalese, Tamil, Bengali, Gujarati (Patel), and Punjabi as parental populations found the following proportions of genetic contribution. The Sinhalese sample size used was 121 individuals.:

Statistical Method	Bengali	Tamil	North Western
Point Estimate	57.49%	42.5%	-
Maximum Likelihood Method	88.07%	-	-
Using Tamil, Bengali and North West as parental population	50-66%	11-30%	20-23%

Parental population	Bengali	Tamil	Gujarati	Punjabi
Using Tamil and Bengali as parental population	70.03%	29.97%	-	
Using Tamil, Bengali and Gujarati as parental population	71.82%	16.38%	11.82%	
Using Bengali, Gujarati and Punjabi as parental population	82.09%	-	15.39%	2.52%

Analysis of X chromosome STRs by Perera et al. (2021) found the Sinhalese (as well as Sri Lankan Tamils and Sri Lankan Muslims) clustered close to the Bangladeshis, apart from the Indian Bhil tribe, other Indians and Europeans reflecting a shared Indo-Aryan ancestry rather than to the Indian Tamils of Sri Lanka.

Genetic distance analysis by Kirk (1976) found the Sinhalese to be closer to the Bengal than they are to populations in Gujarat or the Panjab.

D1S80 allele frequency (a popular allele for genetic fingerprinting) is also similar between the Sinhalese and Bengalis, suggesting the two groups are closely related.

== Relationship to Indian Tamils ==
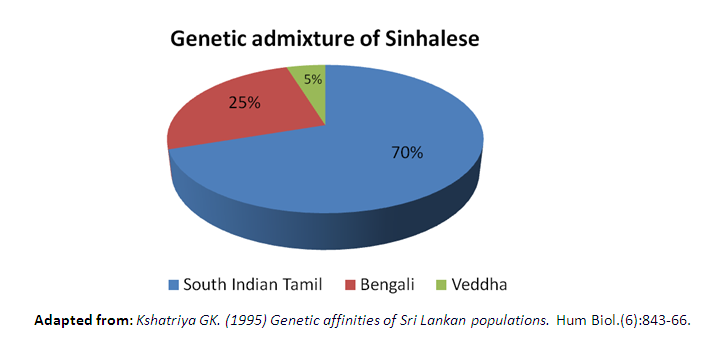
Genetic admixture of Sinhalese by Kshatriya (1995)

A genetic admixture study by Kshatriya (1995) found the Sinhalese to have a higher contribution from Indian Tamils (69.86% +/- 0.61), compared with the Bengalis (25.41% +/- 0.51).

Genetic distance analysis by Roychoudhury AK et al. (1985) suggested the Sinhalese are more closely related to South and West Indian populations, than the Bengalis.

Genetic distance analysis by Kirk (1976) suggested the Sinhalese are closer to the Tamils and Keralites of South India, than they are to the populations in Gujarat or the Panjab.

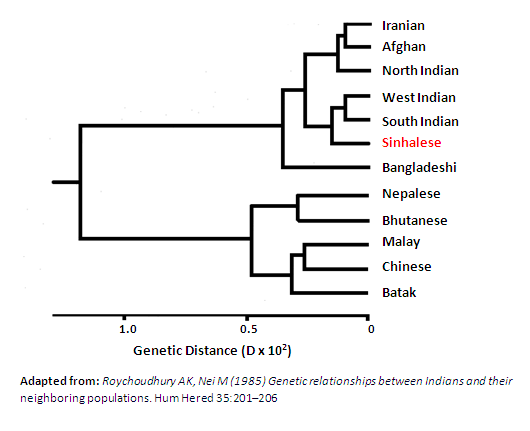
Genetic distance of Sinhalese to neighbouring populations according to Roychoudhury AK et al. (1985)

A 2023 study by Singh et al using higher resolution markers than previous studies found that there was higher gene flow from South India to the Sinhalese than from North India, with the Sinhalese sharing the highest Identity by descent with Tamils, especially the Piramalai Kallars, compared to the other Indian populations studied. The study also found some sharing with the Maratha of India, consistent with a West Eurasian contribution. This sharing of segments suggests common roots of Sinhala with the Marāṭhā corroborating the linguistic hypothesis of Lazarus Geiger, Ralph Lilley Turner, and George van Driem. The total Sinhalese sample size used was 9 individuals.

A 2025 study by Aragon et al again found that the Sinhalese were genetically closer to populations from South India than to populations from North India. The study also failed to find high genetic affinities and allele sharing with North Indian populations. The study collected 35 Sinhalese samples from multiple cities (Galle, Anuradhapura, Kandy, Matale, Ratnapura, Kurunegala, Colombo, Kalutara, and Gampaha) in order to build a more representative picture.

== Relationship to North West Indians ==
An Alu polymorphism analysis by Mastana S (2007) found a North West Indian contribution (20-23%).

Analysis of X chromosome STRs by Perera et al., (2011) showed that the Sinhalese, Sri Lankan Tamils and the Moors of Sri Lanka, cluster close with the Bhil (a tribal group) of North West India.

== Relationship to other major ethnic groups in Sri Lanka ==
A study looking at genetic variation of the FUT2 gene in the Sinhalese and Sri Lankan Tamil population, found similar genetic backgrounds for both ethnic groups, with little genetic flow from other neighbouring Asian population groups. Studies have also found no significant difference with regards to blood group, blood genetic markers (Saha, 1988) and single-nucleotide polymorphism between the Sinhalese and other ethnic groups in Sri Lanka. Another study has also found "no significant genetic variation among the major ethnic groups in Sri Lanka". This is further supported by a study which found very similar frequencies of alleles MTHFR 677T, F2 20210A & F5 1691A in Indian Tamil, Sinhalese, Sri Lankan Tamil, and Sri Lankan Moor populations.

== Relationship to other South Asians and West Asians ==
A 1985 study conducted by Roychoudhury AK and Nei M indicating the values of genetic distance showed that the Sinhalese, along with the four Indian subcontinent populations from Punjab, Gujarat, Andhra Pradesh, and Bangladesh, were closer to Afghans and Iranians than the neighboring East/Southeast Asian groups represented by the Bhutanese, Malays, Bataks in northern Sumatra, and the Chinese.

== Relationship to East and Southeast Asians ==
Genetic markers of immunoglobulin among the Sinhalese show high frequencies of afb1b3 which has its origins in the Yunnan and Guangxi provinces of southern China. It is also found at high frequencies among Odias, certain Nepali and Northeast Indian, southern Han Chinese, Southeast Asian and certain Austronesian populations of the Pacific Islands. At a lower frequency, ab3st is also found among the Sinhalese and is generally found at higher frequencies among northern Han Chinese, Tibetan, Mongolian, Korean and Japanese populations. The Transferrin TF*Dchi allele which is common among East Asian and Native American populations is also found among the Sinhalese. HumDN1*4 and HumDN1*5 are the predominant DNase I genes among the Sinhalese and are also the predominant genes among southern Chinese ethnic groups and the Tamang people of Nepal. A 1988 study conducted by N. Saha, showed the high GC*1F and low GC*1S frequencies among the Sinhalese are comparable to those of the Chinese, Japanese, Koreans, Thais, Malays, Vietnamese, Laotians and Tibetans. Hemoglobin E a variant of normal hemoglobin, which originated in and is prevalent among populations in Southeast Asia, is also common among the Sinhalese and can reach up to 40% in Sri Lanka.

== Paternal Line ==
=== Y-DNA of Sinhalese ===
According to Kivisild et al.(2003), the most common Y-chromosome DNA haplogroups found in the Sinhalese are Haplogroup R2, Haplogroup L, Haplogroup R1a and F in that order.

Frequencies of Y chromosome DNA haplogroups in the Sinhalese
Population	n	C	E	F	G	H	I	J	K	L	N	O	P	Q	R	R1	R1a	R1b	R2	T	Others	Reference
Sinhalese	39	0	0	10.3%	0	10.3%	0	10.3%	0	18%	0	0	0	0	0	0	12.8%	0	38.5%	0		Kivisild2003

== Maternal Line ==
=== MtDNA of Sinhalese ===
Ranweera et al. (2014) found the most common mtDNA haplogroup in the Sinhalese to be, Haplogroup M and Haplogroup U (U7a), Haplogroup R (R30b) and Haplogroup G (G3a1′2).

Haplogroup M represents the dispersal of modern humans around 60.000 years ago along the southern Asian coastline following a southern coastal route across Arabia and India to reach Australia short after.

Haplogroup U7 is considered a West Eurasian–specific mtDNA haplogroup, believed to have originated in the Black Sea area approximately 30,000 years ago. In South Asia, U7 occurs in about 12% in Gujarat, while for the whole of India its frequency stays around 2%, and 5% in Pakistan. In the Vedda people of Sri Lanka it reaches its highest frequency of 13.33% (subclade U7a). It is speculated that large-scale immigration carried these mitochondrial haplogroups into India.

Chaubey states that "considerable number of maternal lineages of Sri Lanka is shared with India, more precisely with southern part of India."
