= Sinhalisation =

Process of growing Sinhala influence on non-Sinhala populations

Sinhalisation is a term derived from Sinhala that has a number of meanings in Sri Lanka. It mainly refers to the assimilation into Sinhalese culture in which the members of another ethno-cultural group are steadily integrated or absorbed into established Sinhalese culture.

== Sociological assimilation ==
In a sociological context it could refer to the assimilation of ethno-cultural minorities in Sri Lanka such as the Sri Lankan Tamils, Chetties, and indigenous Veddas into the majority Sinhalese identity, including some Sinhala Buddhists of the interior such as the Demalagattara and some Catholics such as the Bharatha of the coastal areas of the island nation.

Many noted elite families that had contributed to Sinhala nationalism had been of Tamil origin, themselves Sinhalised in the recent past.

== Politics and government ==
In a political context it could refer to the Sinhala language-favouring policies of the post colonial governments of Sri Lanka that are considered to be major causes of the Sri Lankan Civil War. It is termed as culturo-ideological exclusivism by some when one's cultural values and norms are absolutised in such a manner that a particular way of life is enshrined as superior to all others and must therefore be adopted by others (e.g. the Tamil reaction to the perceived "Sinhalisation" processes of the Sri Lankan state)

It was said to be a cause of the abortive coup by disgruntled Catholic army officers in 1962.

Currently, some observers note that Sri Lankan political parties such as JHU and JVP adhere to a policy of political Sinhalisation.

== Government-sponsored settlement ==
Media uses the word "Sinhalisation" to refer to the process by which the Sri Lankan government funded and sponsored the settlement of Sinhala people in areas traditionally inhabited by Tamils in the north and east of Sri Lanka in order to make the Tamils the minority in the region. Some reports claims that the Sinhalese and Sinhala military families are settled in houses built by money from the Indian government that were intended to improve the welfare of the Tamil people.

== Notes ==
a: Former President J. R. Jayewardene's first paternal ancestor was a Colombo Chetty and there is an excerpt from his biography, authored by Prof. K.M. De Silva & Howard Wriggins, in support of this. Don Adrian Jayewardene, J.R.'s paternal great-grandfather, descended from a Chetty family, but two or three generations earlier, a male of this family had married a Sinhalese by the name of Jayewardene from the village of Walgama near Hanwella and had taken on the name of Jayewardene and by the time Don Adrian arrived on the scene at the tail-end of the 18th century, the process of 'Sinhalisation' of his family had been completed.

The ancestor of the Bandaranayke family was a 17th-century Tamil immigrant Pandaram; a non-Brahmin priest known as Neelaperumal Kalukapuge. The term 'Kalu' in Tamil is different in meaning to the Sinhalese meaning.

A similar process was witnessed in the Kandyan kingdom, where (for example) the ancestor of Pilimatalavuva Maha Adikaram and related families trace or claim ancestry from a Pandyan emperor of the late 17th century, though the Pandyan kingdom had ceased to exist by the 15th century and the region was ruled by the Madurai Sultanate, the Vijayanagara Empire, and the Nayak dynasties.

b: Sri Lanka’s nation-building programme became intimately linked with a Sinhalisation of the state directive. It was expected that the minorities would be assimilated into this new Sinhalese Buddhist nation-state. Moreover, the 1956 election marked the beginning of an era of ethnically-based party politics.

== See also ==
- Sri Lankan Mudaliyars
- Bharatakula
- Demalagattara
- Negombo Tamils
- Kandyan Convention
