= Ambattar =

Tamil caste

- Religions: Hinduism
- Languages: Tamil
- Related groups: Tamils

Ambattar (also known by many other names) is a Tamil caste found in the Indian state of Tamil Nadu and northeastern part of Sri Lanka. Their traditional occupations are physicians, surgeons, midwives and musicians. Leslie in his comparative study of Asian medical systems explains that Vaidiyar title is adopted by members of Ambattars in Tamil Nadu, since they are practicing medicine.

== Etymology and synonyms ==
The name Ambattar is a Tamilised word likely originating from Sanskrit word Ambashtha. The word is derived from the two Sanskrit words amba meaning "near" and stha meaning "to stand" thus meaning "one who stands nearby" in reference to their occupation as surgeons.

In Bengal, the community was also referred as Ambastha which falls under the broader category of Kayasthas and their migration from Kashmir to Bengal and South India was explained in 'Ambastha Kayastha', a book by K. N. Sahay.

They have also been referred to as Maruttuvar, Pariyari and Vaidiyar, Mahamathirar which are all synonyms for physicians. According to one member of the caste, the name used varies from one village to another.

== History ==
=== Social status and customs ===
The Ambattars often carried out the profession of physician-surgeons but later took up other professions such as that of musicians. The social life of Tamil Ambattars is regulated by Brahmanical code, who act as priest in their marriage ceremonies. Like the orthodox North-Indian upper castes, traditionally widow remarriage was not there and the dead are cremated. They perform as priests in marriage ceremonies of the Vellas of Salem district. They may be Shaiva or Vaishnava. The Vaishnava abstain from meat, fish and liquor. Their population is quite large in Salem district. Similar group is also found in South Travencore who work as physician-surgeons, midwives, barbers and priests. They have respectable social status. Ambattars held high positions during Chalukya and Pandya kingdoms.

=== Early Tamil history ===
The Siddhars, the ancient Tamil physicians who claimed to have attained siddhi, hailed mostly from the Ambattar community.

=== Sri Lanka ===
According to the folklore of the Ambattar of Sri Lanka, they arrived in the Jaffna Kingdom as attendants of warriors. Since they came without their wives, they married Sri Lankan Vellalar women.

== See also ==
- Velakkathala Nair
- Isai Vellalar
