= Sri Lankan Chetties =

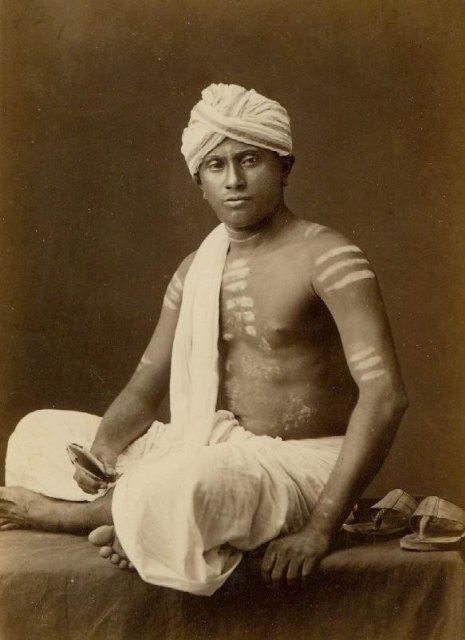
- A Sri Lankan Chetty in Colombo c.1870

Total population
- 6,075 (2012 census)

Regions with significant populations
- Province
- Western: 5,427
- Northern: 348
- Central: 193

Languages
- Sinhala, Tamil, and English,

Religion
- Christianity (mostly Roman Catholic and Anglican), Hinduism

Sri Lankan Chetties (Sinhala: ශ්‍රී ලංකා චෙට්ටි, romanized: Śrī laṁkā Ceṭṭi, Tamil: இலங்கை செட்டி, romanized: Ilaṅkai Ceṭṭi) also known as Colombo Chetties, are an ethnicity in the island of Sri Lanka. Before 2001, they were classified as a Sri Lankan Tamil caste, but then after 2001, they were classified as a separate ethnic group in the 2001 census. They are now collectively referred to as the Colombo Chetties. They were said to have migrated from India under Portuguese rule and were given special rights and representation during colonial rule.

In modern times, the Chetties have been assimilated either into Sinhala or Tamil resp. Vellalar society. Most Chetties grow in Sinhala backgrounds. Hetti is another term used in this context, referring to the present generation of Chetties who do not have any relation to India but are solely from Sri Lanka.

== Etymology ==
The word is thought to have been derived from the Tamil word Etti, an honorific title bestowed on the leading and noble people.

== History ==
They settled mostly in western Sri Lanka, especially in the ports of Colombo from the 16th century to mid 17th century, during the rule of the Portuguese and Dutch. The Chetties of Western Sri Lanka converted to various forms of Christianity during the colonial era: Roman Catholicism under Portuguese rule, as well as to Anglicanism and Reformed Christianity under British rule and Dutch rule, respectively. Marriages between Sinhalese (Sinhala people) and Chetties are very common and therefore many were Sinhalised. The Chetties of Northern Sri Lanka especially in Jaffna were mainly absorbed by the Vellalar caste, although, some still remain separate. A high number of Chetties still live in Nallur, which is known for the inhabitation of high castes, whereas even a road is commemorated for them.

Historical population
Year	Pop.	±%
1871	3,114	—
2001	10,800	+246.8%
2011	6,075	−43.8%
2024	2,443	−59.8%
Source:Department of Census & Statistics; Data is based on Sri Lankan Government Census.

Representatives of the Colombo Chetty Association stressed out their distinctiveness, appealing for forming a separate ethnic group. The Chetties were notably also from 1814 to 1817 listed as a separate ethnic group.

Historically an elite and generally wealthy ethnicity, they no longer strictly marry amongst themselves. In addition, migration to Australia, England, United States of America and Canada has tended to dilute their numbers.

== Notable people ==
- Major General Anton Muttukumaru, the first native Ceylonese to serve as the Commander of the Ceylon Army
- Tyron D. S. Silvapulle PWV, RWP. RWP
- Simon Casie Chetty
- Jeyaraj Fernandopulle

== See also ==
- Bharatakula
- Nagarathar
- Malacca Chitty
