= Vahumpura =

Sinhalese caste

Vahumpura also known as Wahumpura or Dewa people, are a Sinhalese caste, who were the second largest caste in Sri Lanka. They were traditionally producers of jaggery, but have now spread throughout the island undertaking many occupations, including agriculture.

== See also ==
- Caste system in Sri Lanka
