= Bharatha people =

Ethnicity in Sri Lanka

Bharatha People
Total population
- Greater than 1,500

Regions with significant populations
- 1,688 (2012) (0.008% of total)

Languages
- Tamil, Sinhala

Related ethnic groups
- Paravar, Negombo Tamils, Sri Lankan Chetty

Bharatha People (Sinhala: භාරත, romanized: Bhārata, Tamil: பரதர், romanized: Paratar) also known as Bharatakula and Paravar, is an ethnicity in the island of Sri Lanka. Earlier considered a caste of the Sri Lankan Tamils, they were classified as separate ethnic group in the 2001 census. They are descendant of Tamil speaking Paravar of Southern India who migrated to Sri Lanka under Portuguese rule. They live mainly on the western coast of Sri Lanka and mainly found in the cities of Mannar, Negombo and Colombo.

== Etymology ==
Scholars derive Bharatha, also pronounced as Parathar, from the Tamil root word para meaning "expanse" or "sea". The word has been documented in ancient Sangam literature, describing them as maritime people of the Neithal Sangam landscape. Colonial archives refer them as Paruwa, a corrupted form of "Paravar".

According to other scholars is Bharatha a name the community took from the Hindu epic Mahabharata, the clan of Bhāratas, who were the ancestor of the heroes in the epic, following their origin myth from Ayodhya.

== History ==
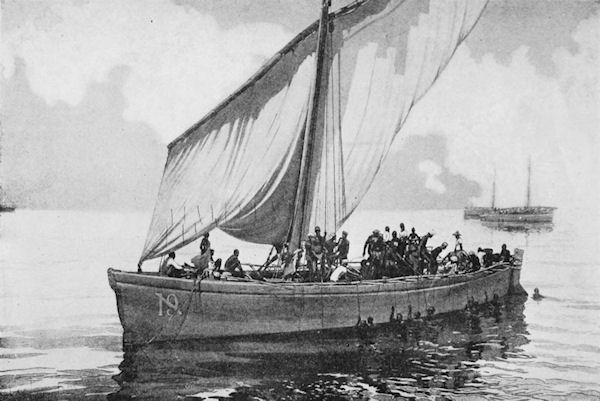
Paravars diving for pearls in the Gulf of Mannar

Historical population
Year	Pop.	±%
2001	2,200	—
2011	1,688	−23.3%
Source:Department of Census & Statistics; Data is based on Sri Lankan Government Census.

They were traditionally occupied in seatrade, pearl diving and fishing. They included the chiefs of the coastal regions, who ruled there as subordinates of the Pandyan kings. The Muslims of Kayalpatnam obtained a lease on pearl fishery by Marthanda Varma. The Bharatas aligned with the Portuguese and overthrew the overlordship by the Muslims and for return were over 20,000 Bharathas converted to Roman Catholicism in 1535.

Several hundreds of Christian converted Bharathas were brought from Indian mainland to the western shores of Sri Lanka by the Portuguese to wrest control on the pearl trade. Cankili I, king of Jaffna Kingdom, ordered the death of 600 Christian Bharathas who were settled in the Mannar District.

Paravar are to be found all over Sri Lanka. Amongst Sri Lankan Tamils Paravar are still a fishing and trading caste although commonly confused with the Karaiyar. The Bharatas or Bharatakula identity is maintained by a relatively prosperous merchant group from India that settled amongst the Sinhalese in the Negombo area.

=== Assimilation ===
Along with Colombo Chetty and other relatively recent merchant groups from South India, there is rapid Sinhalisation or assimilation with the Sinhalese majority. But unlike the Colombo Chettys many still speak Tamil at home and even have marital relationships in India.

According to recent Sri Lankan census categories in July 2001, Bharatakula has been moved out of Sri Lankan Tamil category to simply as a separate ethnic group Bharatha.

== Areas of inhabitation ==
They are primarily found in capital Colombo and in towns north of it, namely Negombo in the Western Province.

== Names ==
Common last names or family names of Bharatakulas include De Croos, Croos, Machado, Perez, Coonghe, Cruz, de Cruz, Pereira, Mascarenhas, Fernando, Ferdinandes, Fernandez, Paiva, Miranda, Motha, Corera, Costa, Rayan or Rayen, Rodrigo, Leon, Vaz, Gomez, Victoria, Kagoo, Carvalho, Almeida and Rubeiro. Fernando is one of the most common last names.

== See also ==
- Pauravas
- Dasarajna
- Colombo Chettys
- Negombo Tamils
- Karave

== Notes ==
- The Census Department's contribution to Sri Lanka's political arithmetic
- Bharathas and Mukkuvas in India
