= Durava =

Sinhala caste in Sri Lanka, traditionally involved in toddy tapping

Durave or Durava or Durawa are a southern coastal Sinhalese caste in Sri Lanka. Like the other coastal castes such as the Karavas and Salagamas, the Durava migrated to Sri Lanka between 13th to 18th century from South India and are of historical Dravidian ethnic origin.

== Current status ==
Many were converted to Catholicism soon after the arrival of Portuguese colonials in 1505 CE. They along with other Southern Sinhalese castes such as Karave and Salagama have played an important role in the historically left political and right parties. They are mostly Theravada Buddhists today and were instrumental in the revival of Buddhism during the British colonial period. The un-Buddhistic practice of caste discrimination introduced into the Sangha by the Siyam Nikaya in the late 18th century has been overcome by patronising the Amarapura Nikaya and the Ramanna Nikayas. Sitinamaluwe Dhammajoti (Durawa) was the last nongovigama monk to receive upasampada before the 1764 conspiracy. The post 13th Century Dravidian origins of the Durava, Karava and Salagama have been used as a justification for favouring pre-13th Century Sinhalese by the Siyam Nikaya.
