= Ceylonese Mudaliyars =

Colonial title and office in Ceylon

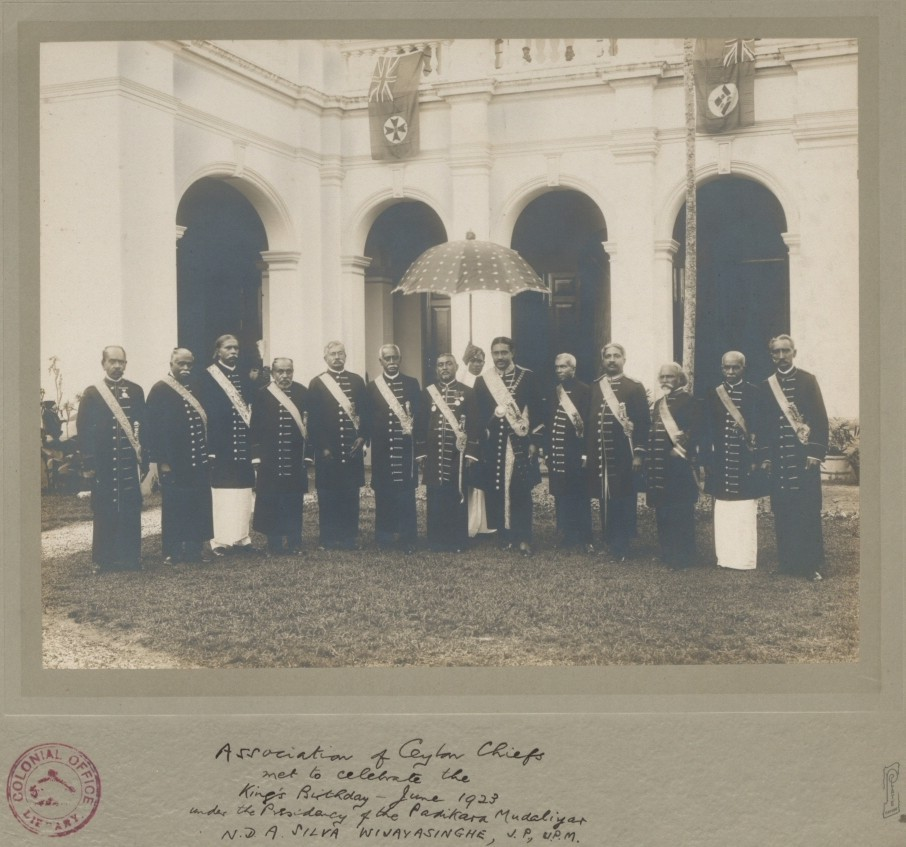
Mudaliyars of the Association of Ceylon Chiefs met to celebrate the King's birthday in June 1923

Mudaliyar (or Mudali) was a Ceylonese colonial title during Portuguese and British rule of the island. Stemming from the native headman system, the title was usually hereditary, made to wealthy influential families loyal to the British Crown.

It was first used by Sinhalese kings and reigning princes from the Polonnaruwa period onwards to ennoble subjects, the Portuguese from the 17th century onwards, followed by the Dutch and British continued use of the Mudaliyar title. The British use differed slightly in that they re-established a Mudaliyar class, at the behest of the Governor of Ceylon, with appointments that had the title of Mudali. This process was stopped in the 1930s when the Native Department of the British government of Ceylon was closed down.

The members of this group formed a unique social group called the Sri Lankan Mudaliyars and associated with older Radala caste. At present, the post of Court Mudliar remains in function in Sri Lankan courts.

== History ==
Mudaliyar is a Tamil title, derived from the word mudhal, meaning "first", and the honorific suffix yar, meaning "The first" as in the person of the first rank. The position was created in the 17th century by the Portuguese to function as a link between the colonial administration and the local populace, as they had done in South India. Incumbents received payment in form of land grants and use of tenured service (Rajakariya) of the local population which they extracted for their own estates.

=== De Saram family ===
A De Saram family of Dutch and Malay ancestry had Sinhalised itself in the late 18th century by posing as the representatives of the masses and subsequently convincing the British rulers that they were from the numerous Govigama caste. This was a strategic move as it gave the British masters the impression that the De Saram family had the backing of a large body of natives. It was also the easiest route to Sinhalisation as the peasant community was widely dispersed, still unstructured, and without inter-community networks or leaders.

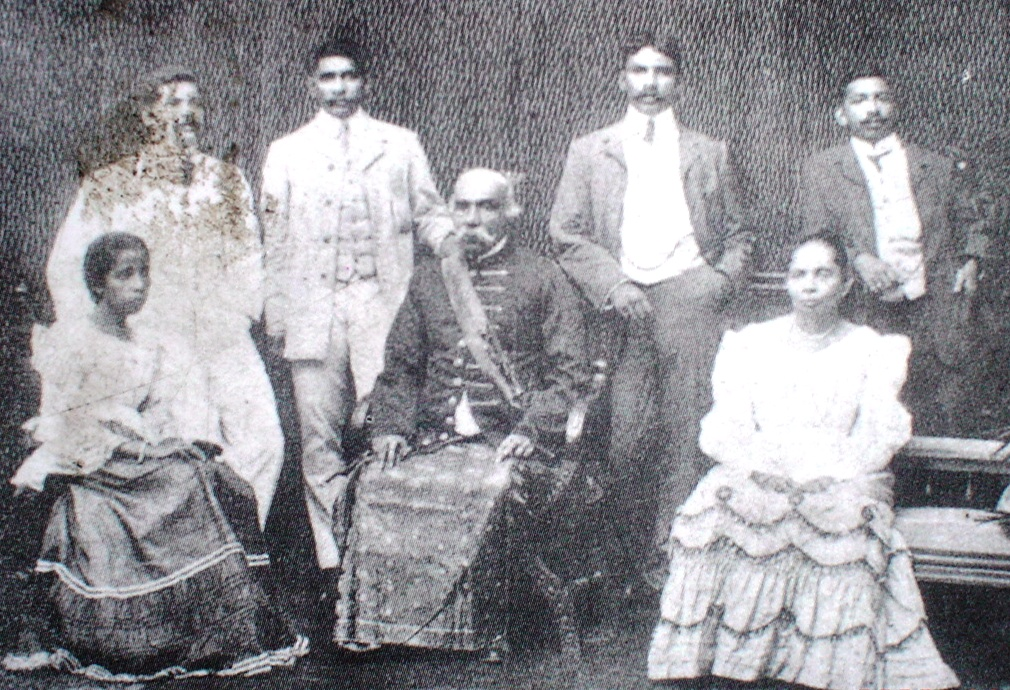
Mudaliyar Don Spater Senanayake, son of Don Bartholomew who assumed the name Senanayake, with son-in-law F. H. Dias-Bandaranaike, sons Don Stephen Senanayake, Don Charles and Fredrick Richard, daughter Maria Frances and wife Dona Catherina Elizabeth Perera.

The first notable ancestor of the De Saram family was an interpreter who accompanied the Dutch Embassy to Kandy 1731–1732. Despite his advanced age of 71 years, this early De Saram had to make the entire journey by foot as his social status did not warrant travel in a palanquin. From there, the De Saram family progressively gained power and position by loyalty, switching religions from Dutch Protestantism to British Anglicanism and benefitting from the preference of British rulers to appoint individuals of unknown ancestry to high positions. By respectively collaborating with the Dutch and British rulers, the De Sarams succeeded in marginalizing the traditional ruling class. Governors Maitland (1805–1811), Gordon (1883–1890) and others effectively used divide and rule policies and created caste animosity among the native elite. The De Saram family eventually had a strong and exclusive network of relatives as Mudaliyars by the late 19th century. Later, through marriage alliances, the network extended to the Obeyesekere, Dias-Bandaranaike, Ilangakoon, de Alwis, de Livera, Pieris, Siriwardena, and Senanayake families.

=== Ponnambalam-Coomaraswamy family ===
As much as the De Saram family was responsible for the rise of the Govigama caste, the Ponnambalam-Coomaraswamy Family was responsible for the 20th century, rise of the Tamil Vellalar caste. The ascendance of the Ponnambalam-Coomaraswamy family commences with a Coomaraswamy (1783–1836) from Point Pedro joining the seminary that Governor North started for producing interpreters. Coomaraswamy passed out and served as an interpreter from 1805. He was appointed by the Governor to a Mudaliyar position at the age of 26 and became the Jaffna Tamil with the highest government appointment. He played a critical role as the Tamil-English interpreter when the Kandyan king Sri Vikrama Rajasinha of Kandy was captured in 1815. He was rewarded by Governor Brownrigg in 1819 for loyal service to the British crown. There were allegations that he was not from the Vellala caste. James Rutnam's research has shown that Coomaraswamy's Father was Arumugampillai, a South Indian, who had migrated to Gurudavil in Jaffna. (Tribune 1957).

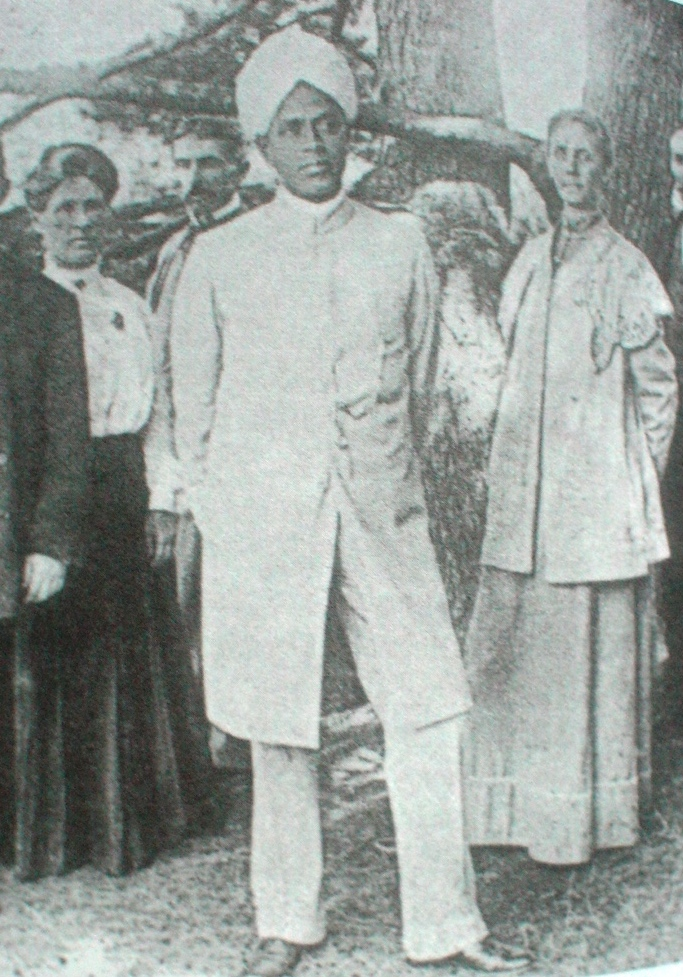
Ponnanbalam Ramanathan in 1906 with his future wife Ms. Harrison (right). Several members of the family were married to western women.

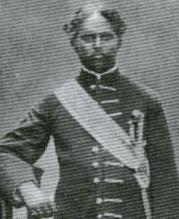
James Edward Corea, a wealthy landowner from Chilaw was appointed Gate Mudaliyar by the Governor of Ceylon. He was placed in charge of the rural police of Pitigal Korale North. Gate Mudaliyar J.E.Corea came from an Anglican Christian background.

Ponnambalam was appointed cashier of the Colombo Kachcheri in 1845 and deputy Coroner for Colombo in 1847. Many leading Englishmen were his friends and it transpired in the 1849 Parliamentary Commission that he used to lend money to government officials. His three sons P. Coomaraswamy (1849–1905), P. Ramanathan (1851–1930) and P. Arunachalam (1853–1926) became national figures. This closely related and endogamous clan emerged as the pre-eminent Tamil family of the country and rose to national elite status. Despite their Anglicized background which propelled their rise, the family presented a staunch Hindu appearance and assumed the role of 'Patrons of the Vellalas in Colombo. However many of its members; Muttu Coomaraswamy, P. Coomaraswamy, P. Ramanathan married western women. Ananda Coomaraswamy was married four times to western women. They helped many young Tamils to secure employment in English Banks and Mercantile establishments. On the death of Mudaliyar Coomaraswamy's wife in 1897, the leading daily, 'The Ceylon Independent' wrote " to her and her husband, almost every important Hindu family in the city owes its rise".

=== Titular Mudaliyars ===
In 1853, the British Governor George William Anderson appointed Jeronis de Soysa, a successful merchant who had undertaken a great deal of philanthropy as a Gate Mudaliyar as an honour in recognition of his philanthropic endeavours. From this point, the Governors made Mudaliyar appointments as titular honours to individuals outside the government service. This practice continued past the discontinuation of the native headman system in 1937 and into the post-independence era until S. W. R. D. Bandaranaike suspended state honours in 1956.

== Ranks of British Mudaliyars ==
Mudaliyars had several classes, of which the official and ex-offico were government servants, whilst the titular was awarded as an honour.

The order of precedence

- Maha Mudaliyar
- Gate Mudaliyar (Wasala Mudaliyar)
- Atapattu Mudaliyar
- Kachcheri Mudaliyar
- Korale Mudaliyar
- Court Mudaliyar

Official

- Maha Mudaliar (Head Mudaliyar) - head of the native headmen of the low country and native aide-de-camp of the governor.
- Mudaliar of the Atapattu - in charge of jurisdiction of a District or Area
- Mudaliar of the Korale – in charge of jurisdiction of a korale

Awarded as an honour (Titular)

- Mudaliar of the Governor's Gate (Gate Mudaliar) (Titular) – awarded as an honour
- Mudaliar (Titular) – awarded as an honour

Ex-officio

- Mudaliar of the Kachcheri – head of the native staff of a Kachcheri
- Court Mudaliar-Court Clerk/Court Interpreter
- Heads of minor departments of public service held the rank of Mudaliar by virtue of their office.

== List of prominent Mudaliyars ==
=== Maha Mudaliyar (Head Mudaliyar) ===
- Maha Mudaliyar Nicholas Dias Abeyesinghe Amarasekere (1719–1794)- Head Mudaliyar of Dutch Ceylon
- Maha Mudaliyar Christoffel de Saram Wanigasekera Ekanaike (1765–1842)
- Chief Mudaliyar Sheikh Abdul Cader Marikar Muhammad Cassim Lebbe Marikar (1805–1877) – Chief Mudaliyar Eastern Province
- Maha Mudaliyar Kaluhath Samson De Abrew Wijeyagooneratne Rajapakshe (1831–1888)
- Maha Mudaliyar Edmund Rowland Gooneratne (1845–1914) – Acting Maha Mudaliyar and formerly Gate Mudaliyar and Atapattu Mudaliyar of Galle
- Maha Mudaliyar Jonathan Percy Nonclars de Lanerole; Appointed Mudaliyar and President of Hinidum Pattu in 1929;
- Maha Mudaliyar Sir Solomon Dias Bandaranike (1862–1946) – Head Mudaliyar
- Maha Mudaliyar Sir James Peter Obeyesekere II (1879–1968) – last Maha Mudliyar
- Samuel Rober Barnes Alagaratnam (Chief Mudaliyar Eastern Province) Batticaloa (1912-1920)

=== Gate Mudaliyar ===
- Gate Mudaliyar Don Johannes Tillekeratne Abeyesekere, Mudaliyar of the Adikarie & Maha Pattus of siyane Korale in the Western Province, retired on pension after serving Government for 53 years in 1876
- Gate Mudaliyar Philip De Silva Pandittsekere Ekanayake Senewiratne Mudaliyar of Siyane Korale
- Gate Mudaliyar Baba Hakim Muthaliph (1779–1839) of Magampattuwa
- Gate Mudaliyar Arumugampillai Coomaraswamy (1784–1836) of Point Pedro
- Gate Mudaliyar Jeronis de Soysa Dissanayake (1797–1862) – First Gate Mudaliyar outside of government service
- Gate Mudaliyar Arunachalam Ponnambalam (1814–1887) of Manipay
- Gate Mudaliyar Baba Thajul Arifin Doole (1834–1909) of Hambantota
- Gate Mudaliyar John Abraham Tillekeratne Abeyesekere (1855-1911) Mudaliyar of Colombo
- Gate Mudaliyar John Vincent Gomis Abeyesinghe Jayawardene (b.1861) of Dadayakkara Walawwa - Kadawatha
- Gate Mudaliyar James Edward Corea (1865– 1955) of Chilaw
- Gate Mudaliyar Alexander Edmund De Silva Wijegooneratne Samaraweera Rajapakse, OBE (1866–1937) of Negombo
- Gate Mudaliyar Tuder Dedrick Nathaniel De Abrew Wijeyagooneratne Samaraweera Rajapakse (1867–1959) of Maha Kappina Walawwa - Balapitiya
- Gate Mudaliyar Abraham Mendis Gunasekera (1869–1931)
- Gate Mudaliyar Abdul Rahman Alim Sahib
- Gate Mudaliyar Edmund Peiris, JP, UM of Kalutara
- Gate Mudaliyar Don Gabriell Kumarasinghe Jayakody (1871–1951) of Jayakody Walawwa - Ganemulla
- Gate Mudaliyar A. C. G. S. Amarasekara, OBE (1883 – 1983)
- Gate Mudaliyar Magamage Vincent Perera Senadhira (1891–1958)
- Gate Mudaliyar Muhammad Samsudeen Kariapper (1899–1989) of Akkaraipattu
- Gate Mudaliyar Manueltamby St. John Puvirajasinghe of Karaiyur, Jaffna.

=== Mudaliyar ===
- Mudaliyar Manuel d' Andrado (1656) of Kalutara
- Mudaliyar Deraniyagala Louis Pieris Samarasinghe Siriwardena (1680–1746)
- Mudaliyar Weerakonhettige Marthalis Gomis Abeyesinghe Jayawardene of Malwatte walawwa(Director of the Government Gardens in 1796)
- Mudaliyar Deogo Kurukulasuriya Arasunilayitta of Karaiyur, Jaffna (1790s) .
- Mudaliyar Henry Alexander Dahanayake (1876 - 1953) of Agrahera Walawwa
- Mudaliyar Weerakonhettige Mattes Gomis Abeyesinghe Jayawardene of Dadayakkara Walawwa - Kadawatha
- Mudaliyar Paulas Gomis Abeyesinghe Jayawardene of Dadayakkara Walawwa - Kadawatha
- Mudaliyar Yakunduwe Dharmasena Hitiralalage Don Richard Perera Wimalasekara (Honorable)(1750s) Waskadu Badda Pothupitiya Pattikarawasala Walauwa
- Mudliyar Dharmasena Hitiralalage Don Devid Perera wimalasekara (1805-1860s)(Honorable) Waskadubadda Pothupitiya Pattikarawasala Walauwa
- Mudaliyar Simon Wilson Gomis Abeyesinghe Jayawardene of Dadayakkara Walawwa - Kadawatha
- Mudaliyar John De Silva Wijegooneratne Rajapakshe, J.P. (1841–1909) of Negombo
- Mudaliyar Don Spater Senanayake (1848–1907) of Botale
- Mudaliyar Ahamath Ibrahim Jainu-Deen (1864–1924) of Badulla
- Mudaliyar Sinathamby Somasundara Aiyer (1881–1953) of Punnalaikkadduvan
- Mudaliyar E.F. Edirisinha, Kachcheri Mudaliyar, N'Eliya
- Mudliyar Nanayakkara Rajawasala Appuhamilage Don Arthur de Silva Wijesinghe Siriwardena (1889–1947) of Richmond Castle, Kalutara
- Mudaliyar Aboobucker of Galle
- Mudaliyar William Mohotti Munasinghe, Aide-de-camp to the British Governor and Mudaliyar of Negombo (1902–1962)
- Mudaliyar Ahamed Lebbe Sinne Lebbe (b 1902) of Batticaloa
- Mudaliyar Don Peiris Weerasinghe – of Nugegoda (b 1911)
- Mudaliyar Shanmugam Tambyah Mudaliyar of Manipay
- Mudaliyar Richard Jayawickrama Wijetunga of Elgiriya
- Mudaliyar Jayasena Madanayake of Peliyagoda
- Mudaliyar Baba Junoor Haji Bahar
- Mudaliyar Komanda Mudali of Kandy
- Mudaliyar Thenahandi David Mendis, MBE (1904–1977) of Negombo
- Mudaliyar Kanaharaaya of Karaveddy, Jaffna.
- Mudaliyar S.W.A. Canagasabey of Batticaloa
- Mudaliyar W.H Canagaretna of Batticaloa

== See also ==
- Kastane
- Muhandiram
- Native headmen of Ceylon
- Radala
- Raja of Chettinad
- Rao Bahadur
- Walauwa
- Captain of the guard
