= Salagama =

Sinhala caste in Sri Lanka

Regions with significant populations
- Sri Lanka

Languages
- Sinhala

Religion
- Buddhism

Related ethnic groups
- Saliya, Devanga, Padmashali, Pattariyar, Thogataveera, Kaikolar

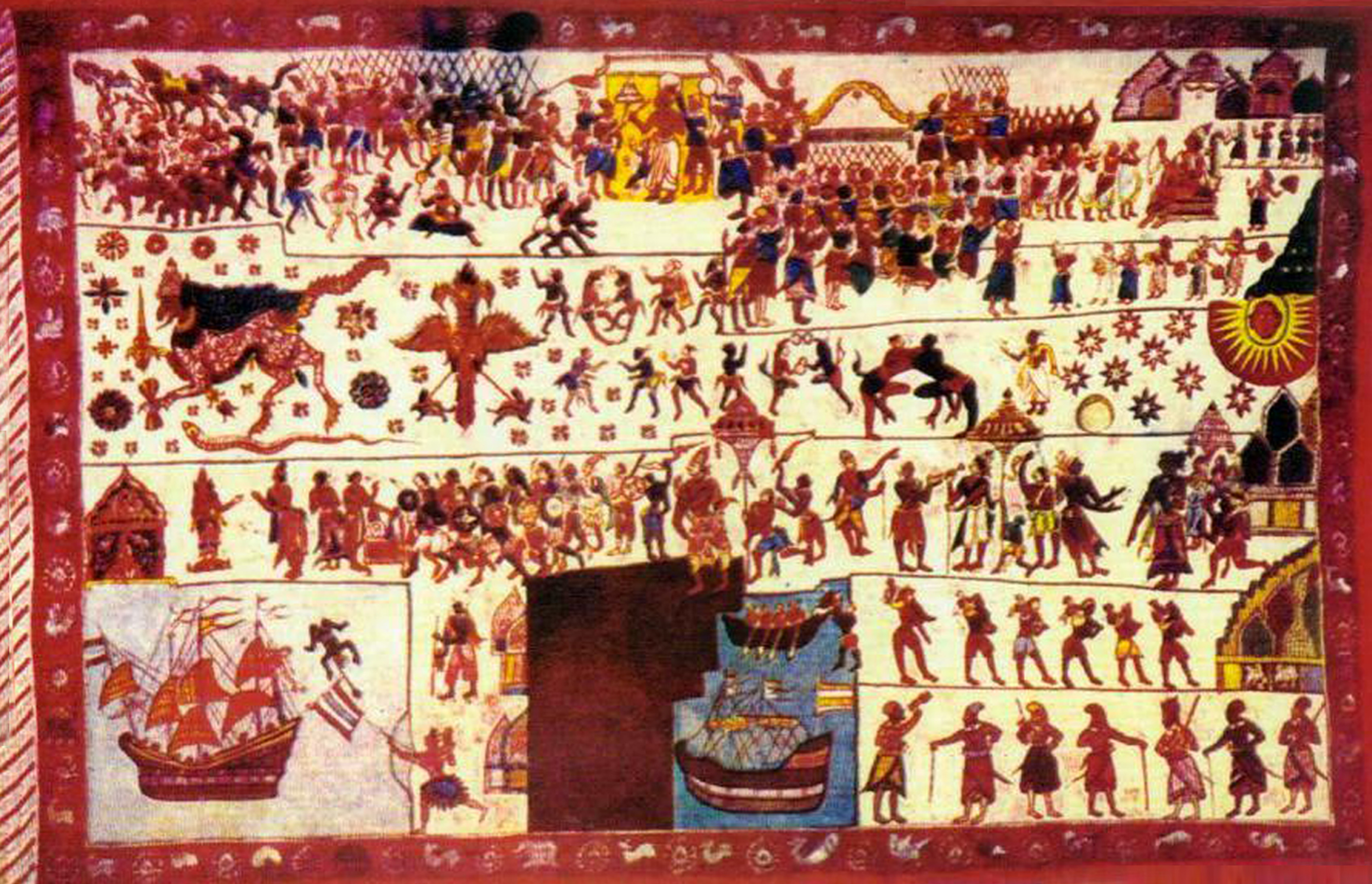
13th Century Salagama Brahakmana Flag

Salagama (also known as Saliya) is a Sinhalese caste found mostly in the southern coastal areas of Sri Lanka. The community was traditionally associated with the cultivation and management of cinnamon and were formerly also involved as weavers and soldiers. Like the other coastal castes such as the Karavas and Duravas, the Salagamas migrated to Sri Lanka between 13th to 18th century from South India and are of historical Dravidian ethnic origin.

== Etymology ==
The Salagamas were also known as Saliya, also spelled Chaliya. The name is presumably derived from Chale of Kerala in southern India.

== History ==
=== Origins ===
The Salagamas trace their roots back to the Coromandel Coast and Malabar Coast of South India, and settled in the southern coastal areas of Sri Lanka. Their ancestors were a weaving community who were known as Saliya also known as Devanga Chettiar of South India. Some Salagamas also have the vasagama or surname "Nambudirige" meaning "of the Nambudiri", which Prof. Gananath Obeyesekere deems as a spurious attempt by the caste to elevate their status to that of the Nambudiri Brahmins of Kerala (Due to caste competition with the Karava who claimed Kshatriya status). Like the other coastal castes such as the Karavas and Duravas, the Salagamas migrated to Sri Lanka between 13th to 18th century from South India.

=== Shift to cinnamon peeling ===
The Salagama were first described as weavers, but overtime they shifted to cinnamon peeling. The 'Heladiva Bamunuwatha' chronicle states that Sapumal Kumaraya ordered the caste to do cinnamon peeling during the period of 1447-1480.

=== Colonial period ===
Under Portuguese rule, many Karavas and Salagamas converted to Catholicism, which opened way to education and administrative careers.

The Portuguese continued the tradition of using Salagamas as cinnamon planters, who had to provide cinnamon as a tax. Queyroz mentions 'Chaleaz' as among the 'high castes' and that they prepared cinnamon for the 'great tax'.

The census of 1824 identified the Salagamas as about 7.5% of the coastal Sinhalese population. However, they were concentrated in the Galle district, where about half of them lived and where they made up almost 20% of the population. Nowadays, most Salagamas are Theravada Buddhists as are a majority of their Sinhalese ethnicity.

== Sub-castes ==
Traditionally, the Salagama were divided into four sub-castes:

- Hewapanne ('warriors' & military officers/generals)
- Panividakara ('Special messengers') or - headmen (equal to Mohottalas)
- Kurundukara (Kurunthukarar in Tamil means ('cinnamon workers').
- Uliyakkara

== Modern radicalism ==
The traditional Salagama areas around Balapitiya, Kosgoda, Ratgama, Hikkaduwa and Boossa were centres of the pan-Sinhalese populist movement of Anagarika Dharmapala (who was not from the Salagama community). The key issues around which this movement emerged were anti-casteism and anti-colonialism.

The same areas were in the vanguard of the independence struggle and became hotbeds of the Lanka Sama Samaja Party and of the Communist Party. These areas were at the forefront of the Hartal of 1953.

== See also ==
- Caste system in Sri Lanka
- Chaliyan, a related Indian caste
- Upatissa of Upatissa Nuwara, the Chief Adviser of King Vijaya
