= List of Dhobis =

List of notable of Dhobis

Dhobi known in some places as Dhoba or Rajaka are Indo-Aryan and Dravidian tribe group in India laundry and agriculture caste.

== Historical people ==
Saints

- Virabhadra – Fierce and fearsome form of the Hindu god Shiva
- Tiru Kurippu Thonda Nayanar – One of the 63 Nayanmars
- Bogar – One of the 18 Siddhars

== Bureaucracy ==
- Vivek Ram Chaudhari
- Roopa Divakar Moudgil
- Anil Kant

== Politics ==
President & Prime Ministers

- Ranasinghe Premadasa – 3rd President of Sri Lanka (1989–1993) and Prime Minister (1978–1989)

Ministers & MP

- Sajith Premadasa
- Shyam Rajak
- Gulabo Devi
- Basavaraju Saraiah
- Arjun Charan Sethi
- Rajesh Diwakar
- Lalit Mohan Suklabaidya
- Dumar Lal Baitha
- Kameshwar Baitha
- Kailash Baitha
- Kamal Kishor
- Yashvir Singh
- Umakant Rajak
- Dumar Lal Baitha
- Hemlata Divakar

MLA's & MLC's

- M.Ethirajulu

== Social reformers ==
- Gadge Maharaj – Indian mendicant-saint and social reformer
- Chakali Ilamma – Indian revolutionary leader during the Telangana Rebellion

== Warriors and kings ==
- Madivala Machideva – A great warrior of the 12th century, he fought valiantly against King Bijjala's army to protect manuscripts of Vachanas
- Chintamoni Dhoba – The ruler of Dhalbhum region and established capital at Ambikanagar
- Neelasothaiyan – The Commander-in-Chief of King Periyathambiran

== Military ==
- Rosli Dhobi – Malay Sarawakian nationalist from Sibu, Sarawak, Malaysia during the British crown colony era in that state
- Ram Chander – MVC was a civilian who was awarded the Mahavir Chakra during the Indo-Pakistani War of 1947

== Freedom fighters ==
- Nathu Dhobi – To lead the Jallianwala Bagh struggle
- A. M. Saravanam – Indian Congress politician.

== Sports ==
- Mamata Kanojia
- Rahul Kanojia
- Shyamji Kanojia
- Preeti Rajak

== Cinema ==
- Usha Rajak
- Rajkumar Kanojia
- Rokesh
- Bullet Prakash

== Business ==
- V. K. Thanabalan – Chairman & Managing Director of Madura Travel Service (P) Ltd, Editor & Publisher madura welcome
