= Rajakulathor (caste) =

Caste among people native to Tamil Nadu, India

Rajakula
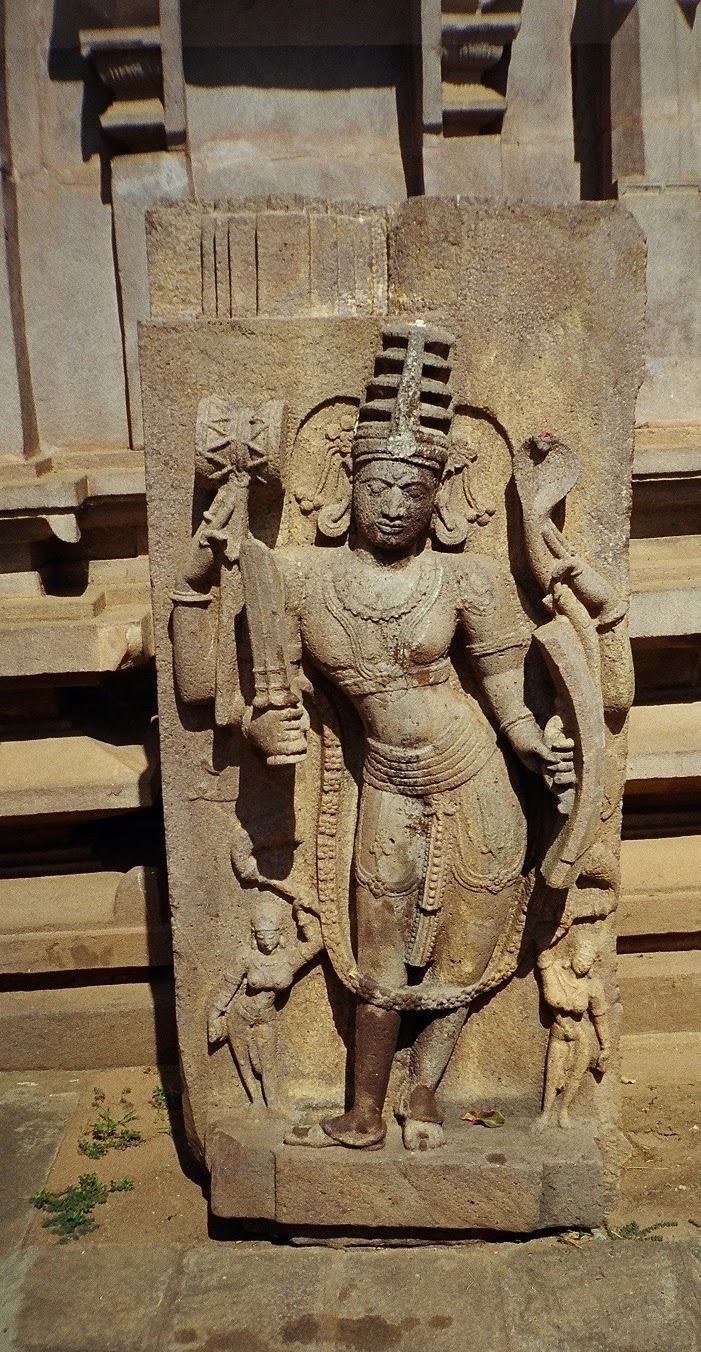
- Virabhadra
- Classification: Dyers, Cultivators, Warriors
- Religions: Hinduism, Lingayatism
- Languages: Tamil
- Country: India
- Original state: Tamil Nadu,

The Rajakula people, who are also collectively known as Rajaka, are native to the Tamil Nadu, Andhra Pradesh, Karnataka, India. They comprise the Vannar, Madivala and Agasa social groups that share a common myth of origin and claim to have once been members of various ancient South Indian dynasties.

== Etymology ==
The following is current regarding the origin of the caste. On the occasion of Dakshas sacrifice Virabhadra got his clothes blood stained, while killing Daksha and his companions. He appeared before Shiva and thoughtlessly allowed his impure garments to come into contact with the God. Rajakas are known as veeraghata madivala on account of their supposed descend from god Virabhadra the son of Shiva.

== Right hand caste faction ==
Rajakula belongs to the Valangai ("Right-hand caste faction"). Some of them assume the title Valangamattan ("people of the right-hand division"). The Valangai comprised castes with an agricultural basis while the Idangai consisted of castes involved in manufacturing. Valangai, which was better organised politically.

== History ==
At the Pooram festival in Kerala, the goddess is usually seen wearing a white robe with a large handle in red, green, orange, black, white.

In India the largest Dasara festival in October in Karnataka and Tamil Nadu is held in honor of the honorable sword given to the Vannars.

Vannars are also the priests of the Bhagavati Amman temple.

== Worships ==
In the Tirunelveli region, Thai deities (female deities) are worshipped in large numbers and are worshipped with a pedestal or trident. In states like Karnataka and Andhra Pradesh, Vannars are still the priests of the Mariamman temple.

== Structure ==
The common honorific titles used by the Rajakulathor are "Rajakula", "Pandiyan", "Mooppar", "kaathavarayan", "Yegaveni", "Nair", "Saayakaran", "Mesthiri", "Thoosar", and "Kaliyar" varying according to their territorial divisions. According to Raja Raja cholan inscription, the villages in Chola administration were termed as "Vannathar".

== Notable persons ==
- Periyathambiran - Ruler of Anuradhapura, Sri Lanka
- Neelasothaiyan - Commander-in-Chief of King Periyathambiran
- A. M. Saravanam - was an indian Congress Freedom fighter

== See also ==
- Jyestha
