= Sri Lankan Vellalar =

Agrarian Sri Lankan Tamil caste

- Religions: Hinduism, Christianity
- Languages: Tamil
- Subdivisions: Historically; currently non-existent : Periya Vellalar; Chinna Vellalar
- Related groups: Sri Lankan Tamils, Sinhaleses, Tamils, Vellalar

Sri Lankan Vellalar (Tamil: இலங்கை வெள்ளாளர், lit. 'Ilaṅkai veḷḷāḷar') is a caste in Sri Lanka, predominantly found in the Jaffna peninsula and adjacent Vanni region, who comprise about half of the Sri Lankan Tamil population. They were traditionally involved in agriculture, but also included merchants, landowners and temple patrons. They also form part of the Sri Lankan Tamil diaspora.

They are reputed as a ritually and numerically dominant caste in the Northern Sri Lankan society, who have contributed among the political elites of the Sri Lankan Tamils. Many of the Tamil Mudaliyars, a high colonial rank, were drawn from the Vellalar caste. In Eastern Sri Lanka, the Vellalars as other prominent castes there, are further divided into kudis or matrilineal clans.

== Etymology ==
The word Vellalar is derived from their art of irrigation and cultivation. The word comes from the Tamil words veḷḷam ("flood", "water" or "abundance") and āṇmai ("lordship" or "management"); thus the word literally means "those who manage water" or "lords of the floods". Dutch archives registered the Vellalar and the Govigama under the term Bellalas.

== History ==
=== Mythological origin ===
A branch of Vellalas, the old ruling caste of Tamil land claimed to have received grain and instruction on its cultivation from the Earth Goddess Parvathi hence Vellalas were called pillais (children of Parvathi). Kings also drove the plow. Vellalars would elaborate by saying that they were both the creators of life (in that they created food) and the rulers of the land.

=== Early history ===
The Sri Lankan Vellalars share partially common origins with the Vellalars of Tamil Nadu. The Vellalar traditionally inhabited the Sangam landscape of Marutham. The Vellalar are spoken of as a group of people right from the Sangam period and are mentioned in many of the classical works of Sangam literature. The Tolkappiyam does not contain the term Vellalar but refers to a group of people called Velaan Maanthar who apart from practising agriculture had the right to carry weapons and wear garlands when they were involved in affairs of the state. The term Vellalar itself occurs in the sense of a landowner in Paripadal. The poem Pattinappaalai lists the six virtues of Vellalar as abstention from killing, abstention from stealing, propagation of religion, hospitality, justice and honesty.

=== Medieval era ===
The Kailayamalai, an account on Kalinga Magha, the founder of Jaffna Kingdom, narrates the migration of Vellalar Nattar chiefs from the Coromandel Coast of South India. Vellalar chiefs from the Malavar and Gangeyar clans were appointed to administrative office by the first Jaffna king Cinkaiariyan (ca. 1280 AD). The Vellalars who were village headmen and landlords bore the title Udaiyar.

=== Colonial era ===
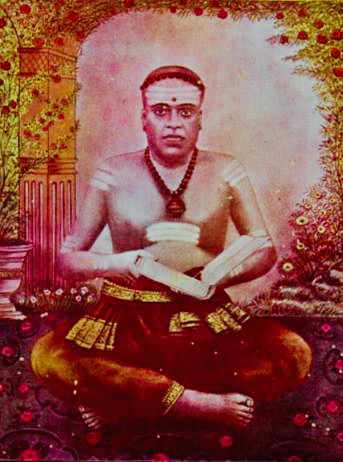
Arumuka Navalar, a 19th-century Shaivite scholar and reputed patron of Shaiva Siddhanta.

In the time of Portuguese Ceylon, the Vellalars were described as husbandmen, who were involved in tillage and cattle cultivation. According to S. Arasaratnam, Vellalar dominance was strengthened by Dutch colonizers after the fall of the Portuguese. The Portuguese had appointed the affluent Karaiyars and Madapallis to administrative offices. Karaiyars and Madapallis revolted against the new Dutch rule in September 1658, consequently leading to the Dutch favoring the Vellalars to administrative positions. The Dutch interpreted the local laws, later codified as Thesavalamai, as allowing landlords to own slaves. Thus the Vellalar chiefs and other landlord castes had the Koviars and also the Panchamar ("the fives") consisting of the Nalavars, Pallars, Paraiyars, Vannars, and Ambattars working under them as domestic servants altogether known as Kudimakkal. These castes were originally bonded to the service of the state, however, they were often illegally turned to be bonded to individual Vellalars as their dominance started growing. The growing power of the Vellalars was counterbalanced by removing the Madapallis from earlier suspicion and equally appoint them to the administrative office by the Dutch in the 1690s.

The Thesavalamai mentions the Koviars as descendant of the Vellalars, and intermarriage between them was not uncommon. According to historians, the Vellalar population increased between the 17th and 19th-century due to other castes and communities assimilating in Vellalar society after the fall of Jaffna Kingdom, which included castes such as the Agampadiyar (palace servants), Chettiar (merchants), Maravar (soldiers), Thanakkarar (temple managers), Madapallis (palace cooks and stewards), Malayalis, and Paradesis (foreigners, skilled workers). There used to be a concept of Periya Vellalan and Chinna Vellalan, where the Chinna Vellalan was a subdivision compromising the castes who had assimilated in the Vellalar identity.

During colonial rule, some Vellalars converted to Christianity. These conversions allowed them to hold land, properties and government offices. The Dutch minister Philippus Baldaeus of the 17th century, described the Christian Vellalars, Karaiyars and Madapallis as the most influential classes of Christians on the peninsula. Under Dutch rule in the 18th century, some Vellalars earned fortunes through tobacco cultivation. The Vellalars started to become a dominant caste in the Jaffna Peninsula and also the most numerous in the Dutch census.

Due to the effort of the religious reformer, Arumuka Navalar, the conversion to Christianity of many Hindu Vellalars was prevented. They became under his patronage, strict followers of Shaiva Siddhanta, and achieved dominance through ritual design. Well-to-do Vellalars from Jaffna and Colombo formed one of the political Sri Lankan Tamil elites, one of such being the Ponnambalam-Coomaraswamy family.

=== Modern era ===
Vellalar political and ritual dominance was severely restricted due to the post-1983 Sri Lankan civil war domination of Tamil politics by the main rebel group Liberation Tigers of Tamil Eelam (LTTE). The LTTE did not have caste distinctions and one of their ideologies were anti-casteism, seeking a united Tamil identity through recruiting of other castes and achieving a mixed-caste leadership. Following the old order, where the Vellalars formed partners with the Karaiyars, the LTTE gained support and recruitment from the Vellalars who also contributed as leaders and cadres.

The People's Liberation Organisation of Tamil Eelam (PLOTE), Tamil Eelam Liberation Organization (TELO) and Eelam Revolutionary Organisation of Students (EROS) were Vellalar dominated organizations, with several Vellalar cadres of these organization later joining the LTTE.

== See also ==
- Ponnambalam-Coomaraswamy family
- Arumuga Navalar
- List of Vellalar sub castes
- List of Vellalars
