= Village deities of Sri Lankan Tamils =

Village deities are a common feature of the Hindu pantheon of deities. They are known as Gramadevatas. Each Hindu region and caste of India and South Asia has its share of village deities. Sri Lankan Tamils venerate their own group of village deities throughout Sri Lanka, specifically in the Tamil-dominated north and east of the island nation.

== List of Hindu deities ==
- Annamar is a deity of the Nalavar and Pallar caste.
- Ayyanar, sometimes equated with Sasta is a popular deity in almost all villages. Aiyan is the Tamil name for Buddha and the Aiyanar deity was first syncretised with Buddha.
- Elu Kanniyar take the form of seven virgins.
- Kanakampikai Amman is the guardian goddess of the Vanni region.
- Kannaki Amman is the chief deity of the coastal folk.
- Kali, also Bhadrakali, is a popular female deity. Bhadrakali and also Vairavar (common deity in most villages) are both also worshipped in the form of the trishula.
- Kattavarayan is a heroic saviour god and a deity of the Kōviars.
- Naccimar is a women's goddess often conflated with Mariamman or Ampal, the mother Goddess.
- Naka Tampiran, a form of Shiva is also common deity in most villages.
- Periyatampiran, a form of Shiva is a caste deity of the Vannar
- Valliyakkan, a Yaksha deity popular among the Paraiyars.
- Varunan, the sea god, used as totem by the Karaiyars.
- Virumar, a form of Brahma is a deity of the Kollar and Tattar.
- Ilanthari

== Sanskritisation ==
The identities of some of above the lesser known deities had been lost and most of them are now identified as Vairavar and Kali. Both are worshipped in the form of Trisulam. Furthermore, the Saiva revivalism initiated by Arumuga Navalar has enabled many high status Tamils to subsume the village deities within the Agamic pantheon. Within the Jaffna Peninsula, a number of temples dedicated to Kannaki Amman has been converted to Bhuvaneshwari, Rajarajeshwari and Mariamman temples. The Nagapooshani Amman temples of that region, such as those in Alaveddy, Suruvil, and Sandilipay, are all said to have been temples dedicated to Kannagi. In other parts of Sri Lanka, the goddess was assimilated into Korravai or Durga. Other deities whose worship is undergoing transformation in the region are Annamar and Valliyakkan, converted into Muruga and Narayana. The religious reforms that have taken place in Jaffna society since the 19th century have oriented religious practices towards the complete adoption of the agamic rite and the exclusive use of Brahmins for worship. Nowadays, Sri Lankan Tamil religious practices, particularly in the northern part of the island, are largely influenced by South Indian Tamil Brahminical and Saiva Siddhanta orthodoxies.

Similarly have some of the deities been Christianized under the colonial influences. As many coastal inhabitants were under Portuguese rule converted to Catholicism, were many coastal Kannaki Amman shrines converted to churches of Our Lady (a title of Mary, mother of Jesus).

== See also ==
- Religion in ancient Tamil country
- Village deities of Tamil Nadu
