= Sri Lankan Paraiyar =

Sri Lankan Tamil caste involved traditionally as parai-drummers

Sri Lankan Paraiyar is a Tamil caste found in northern and eastern Sri Lanka. They are traditional parai-drummers who were also involved in weaving. Sri Lankan Tamil paraiyar of the north plays a uniquely large drum different to the parai drum of Tamil Nadu. Meanwhile, the Tamils of the East uses the daula parai drum a Sri Lankan low country drum instrument, also a shared culture almongst Sinhalese as well, accompanied with Kutty kuzhal or the Sinhala equivalent of horanawa during temple percussions, however unlike its northern counterpart the drum of the east is not caste confined and is regularly played by ordinary Tamils. Both instrument are played during temple percussion with trincomalee witnessing a beautiful fusion of both the northern and eastern parai culture in temples. The instrument of the north is also accompanied during funereal percussion.

== Etymology ==
The name Paraiyar is thought to be derived from the word "parai" which means (to tell) in the northern Tamil dialect and was involved as royal news informers of the jaffna kingdom. The word parai is a homophone word also meaning to inform news in the northern dialect. In contrast to the South Indian parai, which is a skinny one sided frame drum, the parai played by the Sri Lankans is large, stocky and double sided resembling the Dhol or “udal” of the now revived drum music in kailaya vadhiyam . The earliest mention of the Paraiyars is in Sangam literature, and the Purananuru, of the 1st century BCE.

They are also known as Sāmban (fem. Sāmpathi), which is thought to derive from saambu, another word for the parai drum. The name might also be derived from Saambu, a name of Shiva, one of the principal deities in Hinduism, of whom they attribute their mythical origin to.

== History ==
=== Myth ===
According to one myth, there were two priest brothers of a Mariamman temple. One day. the elder brother decided to fast and observe a pledge of silence while his younger brother was set to watch over the temple. He, therefore, told the people "Nān parayyan, tambi pārpār" which means "I will be silent (parrayan), brother will watch (parpar)". However it was misunderstood by the people as "I am paraiyan (drummer), brother is parpar (Tamil name for Brahmin priest)".

Another myth states that Nandanar was born out of the union of Sukkira Bavan and Kāti. Kāti was one of the 27 daughters of the sage, Kashyapa and Virupasikai. She and her children went to live in the forest and were considered impure as they in addition to weaving and delivering messages to others, also slaughtered cows and goats. Nandanar who was a Nayanar and devotee of Shiva, progressed with Kāti and her other children's to live in a ceri settlement between the forest and village for keeping themselves pure. Nandanar and the children of Kāti are said to represent the ancestors of the Paraiyars.

=== Early history ===
The Sri Lankan Paraiyars may share common origin with the Paraiyars of Tamil Nadu. There are few references to them in early literatures. However, the earliest mention of the Paraiyars is in the Sangam literature, Purananuru, of the 1st century BCE, mentioning them along with other minstrel communities such as the Panar (bards) and Tudiyar (tudi drummers). These groups were connected to warfare and exhortation. The parai drum was played for summoning soldiers for war and for announcements of news. It was believed that the playing of the parai drum could cause the enemies defeat. The Valluvars (subsect among Paraiyars), were royal heralds and court priests during the Sangam period. The Jain work, Perunkatai ("the Great story") of latter half of 7th century, mentions the Valluvars as royal heralds who made royal proclamations such as announcing significant news and events to the public. The proclamation was made by them while riding on an elephant and beating the parai drum. It is thought the ancient Tamil poet Thiruvalluvar, author of Thirukkuṛaḷ, hailed from this community.

=== Medieval History ===
There are mentions of Paraiyar chieftainship in the 8th and 10th centuries. A Chola inscription of the Raja Raja Chola period (985 – 1014 AD), mentions the ceri (a hamlet) settlement of the ulaparaiyar (agricultural Paraiyars). Several inscriptions records gifts given by Paraiyars to Hindu temples. Individual wealthier Paraiyars endowed lighting to the temples, such as to a Shiva temple at Tirukalukunram. The Paraiyars belonged to the Valangai (right-handed) division, featured under the Cholas. The king Raja Raja Chola I created the valangai velaikarar, a special regiment of the Chola army in Sri Lanka. The Paraiyars were under the Jaffna kings, traditional weavers and heralds. Some of them also practised native medicine and astrology. The text Vaiyapadal mentions the voyagee of the ship captain Meekaman who sailed with several communities including the Paraiyars.

The chaya root was used for extracting the saffron color. The chaya industry in Jaffna was recorded by the Portuguese. Even the Jaffna king were known as Chaya Raja, and a subcaste among the Paraiyars, Verkkutti Paraiyar, were involved in chaya root digging. The textile industry had great importance in the ancient and medieval Jaffna, where weaving was carried out by the Kaikolars and the Valluvar subcaste of Paraiyars.

=== Colonial History ===
The Paraiyars had independent occupation in the weaving industry. Some of them were also waste pickers as observed by the Dutch minister Philippus Baldaeus. Paraiyars from Tamil Nadu also migrated to Sri Lanka in the 19th century for working in the tea plantations in Sri Lanka and constitute along with the Pallar half of the plantation worker population.

== Customs ==
The Paraiyars of Jaffna, in contrast to other communities, retain a dialect with a number of archaic Tamil words and few Prakrit words. One of their patron deities are Valliyakkan (mighty yaksha), Valliyappan and Karuppan. Valliyakkan was apparently the chief among the twelve Mudi-Mannar (crowned kings). Their priests are known as Valluvakurukkal. Muppan (alderman), Valluvan (priest), Vettiyan (cremator or watchmen), and Thōtti (scavenger) are common titles among their headmen

They also have a distinct dance known as Parai mela kooththu, a tradition of dancing with the parai and sornali (double reed instrument) for celebrating new year and other special occasions. With the increased popularity of the thavil and nadaswaram in the 17th and 18th century also encouraged by Hindu reformer Arumuka Navalar, decreased also the use of the parai drum in the temples. The brass drum raca melam ("king's drum") serve as a heraldic symbol for the caste and serves as the insignia for the Muppan in the Batticaloa region.

The Paraiyars came under the term Kudimakkal and served as paid drummers under ceremonies such as funeral. They had their own dhobi known as Thurumbar, who also washed clothes for the Sri Lankan Pallars and Nalavars. The Paraiyars who also were involved in native medicine and astrology, maintained the genealogy of their feudal lords.

== See also ==
- Berava (people)
- Pulayar
