= Koviyar =

Agrarian Sri Lankan Tamil caste

- Religions: Hinduism, Christianity
- Languages: Tamil
- Related groups: Sri Lankan Vellalar, Sri Lankan Tamils, Govigama, Sinhalese

Koviyar (Tamil: கோவியர், romanized: Kōviyar, also known as Covia) is a Tamil caste found in Sri Lanka. They are traditional agriculturalists, temple guardians and temple workers but also included feudal lords, warriors, mercenaries, merchants, landowners and temple patrons.Kattavarayan as caste deity is observed by the Koviar. They are reputed as a ritually dominant caste and regarded as the "cousin" caste of the more numerical dominant caste, Sri Lankan Vellalar.

== Etymology ==
The name "Koviyar" can be used exchangeably with the names Kovilar and Kovalar, which have roots in the Tamil word Kōn, signifying "king". This term may have originated from the Tamil word kōl, representing a king's scepter.

The Yalpana Vaipava Malai states that the term Koviyar stems from Kovil, a Tamil term meaning temple. Another theory states that they are descended from Sinhala prisoners of war, and that Koviyar is a Tamilised form of the Sinhala Goviya. Tamil dirge songs sung by Vellalar women during funeral rituals carried out by Koviyar refer to them as Sinhalas ("O you Kovia, Sinhala").

In the Yalpana Vaipava Malai composed during the Dutch colonial period, explains the etymology of the term Koviyar as deriving from Kovilar, meaning servants of the temple (Kovil). It says that the Koviyar were once servants and protectors of the temples who later on, because of poverty and war, sold themselves to the temples as workers. When the Portuguese colonists arrived and destroyed all the Hindu temples in Jaffna, the Kovilar were said to have been sold off as slaves by the Portuguese. The chronicle also speaks of a people of a "high caste" who due to poverty were sold off as slaves.

== History ==
=== Early period ===
They are mentioned in the Thesavalamai law of the Jaffna Peninsula, which was codified by the Dutch under their rule. There they are stated as descendants of the Sri Lankan Vellalar. Intermarriages between the Vellalars and Koviyars were common. Other traditions account that they were Sinhalese captives from the Govigama caste who were settled in Jaffna Kingdom, suggested by their ritual status being equal to that of the Vellalars with whom they share similar traditional occupation with. The Vaiya Padal states that they were one of the castes who came from Tamil country in Southern India and were apparently herdsmen. Yet there is no evidence of a similar caste population in Tamilnadu. Vellalar men often took concubines from the Koviyar community, and the children are entitled to Vellalar status as well as certain paternal inheritances.

The Koviyars were looked upon as the local henchman of the Sri Lankan Vellalar by the colonial powers. They collected taxes for the Vellalar from the people who worked in their farmlands, these people included the "kudimakal" Pallar, Nalavar in promise to get goods, money and lands in return from the landowners.

=== Colonial period ===
The political rise of the Vellalar under Dutch Ceylon, pushed the Koviyar along with the Pallar and Nalavar into slavery through the legalisation of the Thesavalamai law, who were a group initially bound to only serve the state as tenant farmers. They were after the abolishment of slavery considered as domestic servants or Kudimakkal for a section of dominant castes, and had the role as ceremony officiators.

Koviyar together with the Vellalar and the Sinhalese Govigama got more administrative roles during the British rule. According to M.D Raghavan, Koviyar dominance was strengthened by British colonizers after the fall of the Dutch. Koviyar who were pushed to slavery by the Portuguese and oppressed during the Dutch, now saw a resurgence in the economical and socio-political arena.

=== Modern period ===
After Sri Lanka’s independence from Britain in 1948, Sri Lankan Tamil politics was geared towards a nationalistic cause. Koviyar using their ritual and physical proximity to the educational services upgraded themselves socially and economically. The Policy of standardization imposed by the successive Sri Lankan governments since 1973 had the effect of restricting the number of Tamil students entering state Universities and affected upwardly mobile Koviyar students as much as the dominant class. Hence Koviyar were also involved in many of the Tamil nationalistic agitations that eventually resulted in the formation of many Tamil militant groups. They were prominent in one of them namely TELO that was eventually eclipsed by the LTTE that was also seen as to be associated with Karaiyar caste in Jaffna.

The civil war and the Black July pogroms have retarded most of these gains and many have escaped the deprivations by seeking refugee status in India, Europe and North America. They are merging with the host populations and/or the Sri Lankan Tamil diaspora.

== See also ==
- Caste system in Sri Lanka
- Village deities of Tamils of Sri Lanka
