= Thurumbar =

A Sri Lankan Tamil caste involved traditionally as launderers for Dalit castes

Thurumbar (also known as Thurumba Vannar and Puthirai Vannar) is a Tamil caste found in northeastern part of Sri Lanka and the Indian state of Tamil Nadu. They are traditionally occupied in laundry, notedly performed in service for caste members from the lower strata. They are also known for their involvement as sorcerers.

== Social status ==
They were subjugated to untouchability and were known as "unseeable caste", as they were only allowed to travel at night, and some even obliged to drag a palmyra palm behind them. It is speculated that it served the purpose for either notify their whereabouts or for members from privileged castes to avoid their footprints.

== Etymology ==
The term Thurumbar, also spelled Turumbar, might be derived from the Malayalam word tirumbika meaning "to wash". It might also be derived from the Tamil word turumbu meaning "straw".

== Customs ==
They are in some regions considered to be a subcaste of the greater Vannar caste, and in other as an independent caste. One of the kuti (or clan) name of the Batticaloa Vannars is Thurumba Vannar. They are in Sri Lanka noted for performing laundry for members from the Sri Lankan Paraiyar, -Pallar, and Nalavar castes. The Thurumbar had a reputation for being involved in sorcery, known in Tamil as sūniyam, and would use it to injure or kill other's for a fee.

According to the archeologist Ponnambalam Ragupathy, they were earlier scavengers who later took to laundry.
