= Krishnaswami Temple, Muthialpet =

Coordinates: 13.098956°N 80.289377°E

Religion
- Affiliation: Hinduism
- District: Chennai
- Deity: Lord Krishnaswami

Location
- Location: Chennai
- State: Tamil Nadu
- Country: India
- Interactive map of Krishnaswami Temple, Muthialpet

Architecture
- Completed: 18th century

The Krishnaswami Temple is a Hindu temple located in the neighbourhood of Muthialpet in Parry's corner (Old: George Town), Chennai, India. It was constructed in the 18th century and was the site of a major dispute between Left hand and Right hand castes in 1787 resulting in a major riot. The conflict eventually came to an end with the mediation of the authorities of the Madras government.

== See also ==
- Religion in Chennai
