= Chakali =

Chakali may refer to:

- Chakali (caste), a local name of the Rajaka caste of South India
- Chakli, a savoury snack from India
- Chakali language, a Gur language of Ghana
- Chakali Ailamma (1919–1985), Indian revolutionary
