= All India Rajakulathor Peravai =

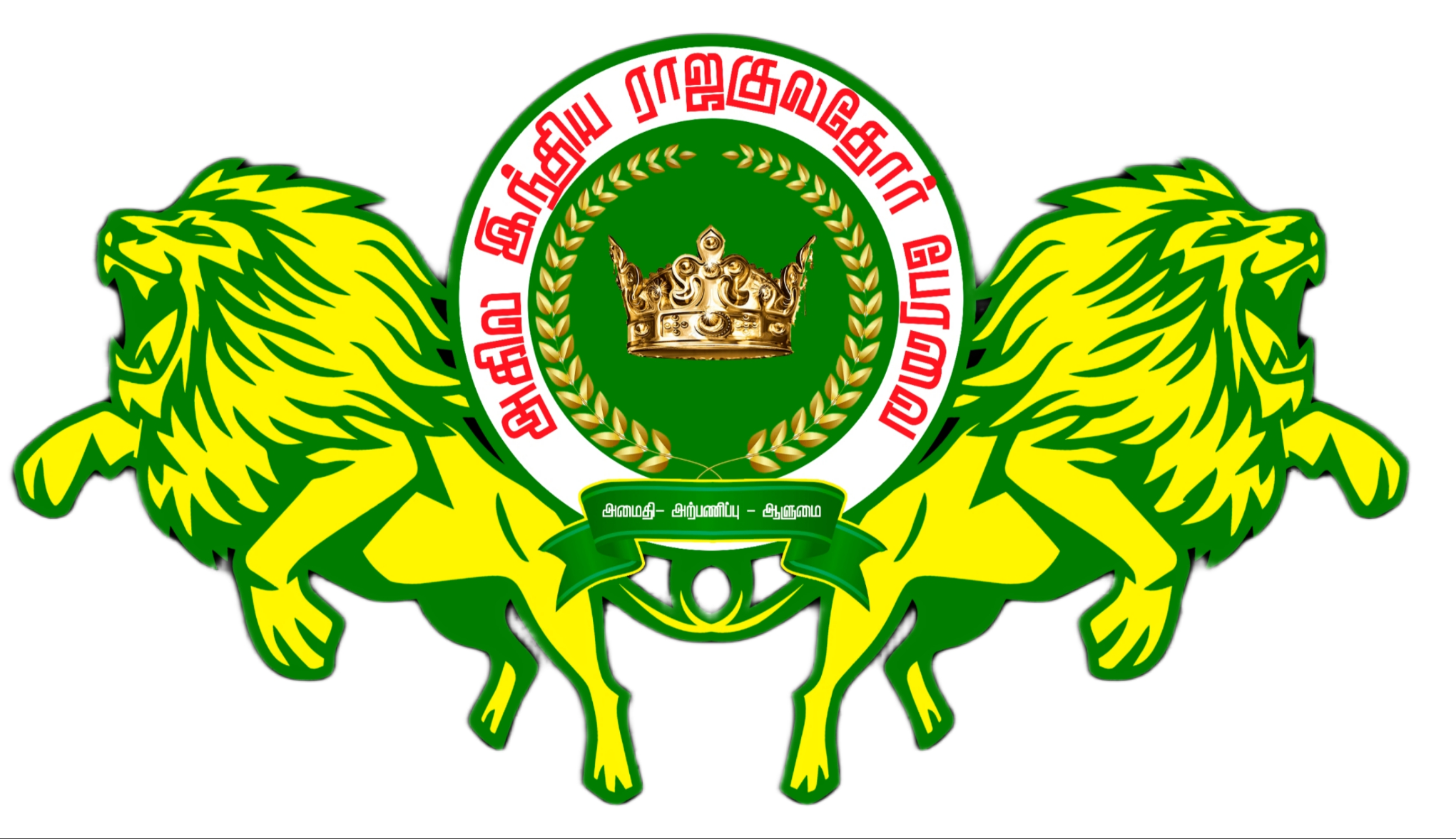
- Founder: Vengadeshkumar BABL
- Founded: 2021
- Headquarters: New No. 155, Old No. 30, Vinayakapuram 2nd Street, Arumbakkam, Chennai-600106
- Student wing: All India Students Bloc
- Youth wing: All India Youth League
- Women's wing: All India Womens Samiti
- Ideology: Anti-Casteism; Social Justice; Tamil nationalism Social equity
- Colours: Yellow; White; Green

Party flag
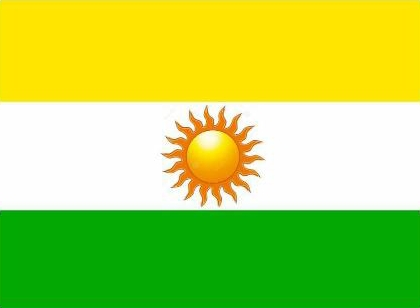

Website
- rajakulathorperavai.com

Vengadeshkumar Speech

All India Rajakulathor Peravai is a political party in the Indian state of Tamil Nadu.The party formed to gain votes in Rajakulathor.

== Origins and platform ==
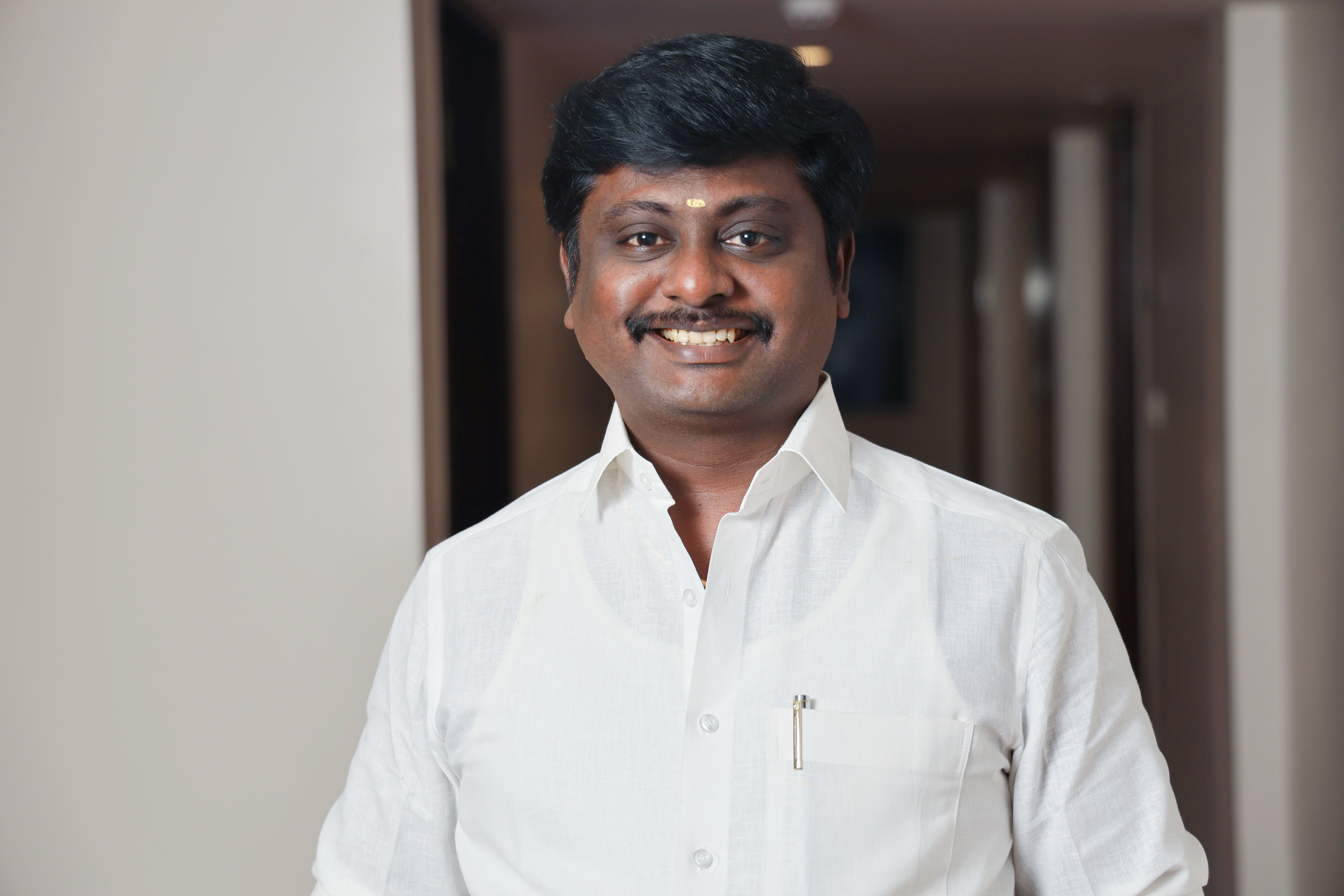
Dr. M. K. Vengadeshkumar BABL, founder and Leader of All India Rajakulathor Peravai

This assembly originated in Chennai and the first meeting of state administrators in Trichy district was well attended by nearly a thousand people, the founder, who is a High Court advocate, is the former State Students' Deputy Secretary of the Dravida Munnetra Kazhagam and is close to former Member of Parliament T. K. S. Elangovan.
