= Madapalli =

Subcaste of the Sri Lankan Vellalar

Madapalli (Tamil: மடைப்பள்ளி, romanized: Maṭaippaḷḷi) is a caste found mainly in the northern part of Sri Lanka. Found today as a subcaste of the Sri Lankan Vellalar, the Madapallis were considered an independent caste until recently.

Originally serving as cooks for the Jaffna kings, they were also appointed as palace steward of the Jaffna Kingdom. They were reputed as a powerful caste in the colonial era, who held the positions of Mudaliyars and Kanakkapillais.

== Etymology ==
The etymology of Madapalli is disputed. The word Madapalli can in the Tamil language mean "kitchen" or "cook house", specifically used in a temple, derived from the Tamil words maṭai meaning "cooking" and paḷḷi meaning "place of worship". Mudaliyar Rajanayagam gives the meaning of Madapalli as signifying "Royal kitchen".

Others derive the word from a place called "Madapalli" located in the Kalinga region, where some claim origin from. Another theory suggest the word being derived from Madappan meaning "500 villages", as they claim themselves as rulers of 500 villages in the Kalinga region.

== History ==
As the etymology suggest, the Madapallis were the former cooks of the Jaffna Kingdom. The Yalpana Vaipava Malai credits the last king, Cankili II, with creating the class of Madapalli. Cankili appointed higher-classes of Vellalars as cooks and officials of the royal kitchen personnel. Some of them were descendant of concubines of the last Aryacakravarti nobles. Those working for the royals were known as Raja Madapalli, those working for the ministers were known as Sarva Madapalli, and those who blew the conch in the temples were known as Sanku Madapalli. The Sanku Madapallis constituted of the Akampadiyar, Paradesikal, Sangamar and the Panar communities.

After the fall of Jaffna Kingdom, sections of the Madapallis were converted to Christianity and drew closer to power under the Portuguese colonizers in the 16th century. After the Portuguese were defeated by the Dutch colonizers, the Christian Madapallis along with the Karaiyars revolted against the Dutch rule in the Jaffna region in 1658. The Dutch started favoring the Vellalars, whose power started to grow rapidly under their reign. To counterbalance the growing power of the Vellalars, the Madapallis were removed from earlier suspicion and were equally appointed to the administrative office by the Dutch in the 1690s. Larger numbers of the Ceylonese Mudaliyars were drawn from the Madapallis who were constantly in rivalry with the Vellalars for political power. The Dutch minister of 17th century, Philippus Baldaeus, described the Christian Madapallis along with the Christian Karaiyars and Vellalars as the most influential classes of the Christians. The Madapallis took up agriculture as occupation and merged and formed a subcaste of the Vellalars.

== See also ==
- Caste system in Sri Lanka
