= Nathoo =

Nathoo can refer to the following:

- Alternative spelling of the name Nathu
- Nathoo, long-lost son of Messua in The Jungle Book.
