= Chowdavarapu Vishwanatham =

Chowdavarapu Vishwanadham (1921–2002) was born in Gudur Village, Mandal Palakurthi, District Waranagal, Telangana State. He was a freedom fighter, philanthropist and social worker.

He participated in the movement for liberation of Hyderabad State as member of Andhra Maha Sabha and actively worked as congress leader under the leader ship of Swami Ramananda theertha. He was arrested by the Nizam government number of occasions for participating and organizing people against the rule of Nizam. He also played active role in library movement in the then Hyderabad state.
