= Geervliet =

Town in South Holland province, Netherlands

- Coat of arms

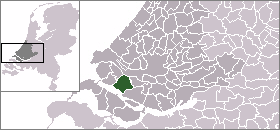

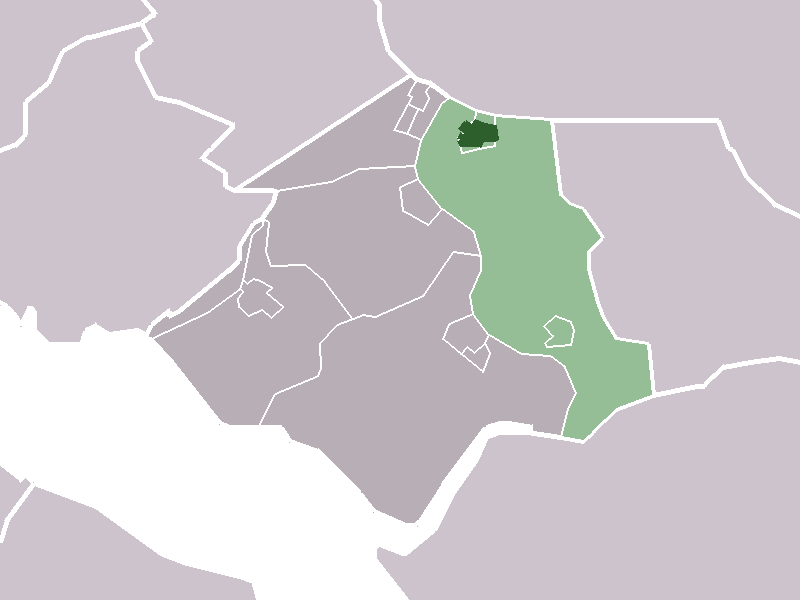
- The town centre (darkgreen) and the statistical district (lightgreen) of Geervliet in the former municipality of Bernisse.
- Coordinates: 51°52′N 4°16′E
- Country: Netherlands
- Province: South Holland
- Municipality: Nissewaard

Population (2006)
  - Total: 1,759

Geervliet is a town in the Dutch province of South Holland. It is a part of the municipality of Nissewaard, and lies about 6 kilometres (3.7 mi) northwest of Spijkenisse on the Brielse Meer. It received city rights in 1381.

Geervliet was a separate municipality until 1980, when it became part of Bernisse.

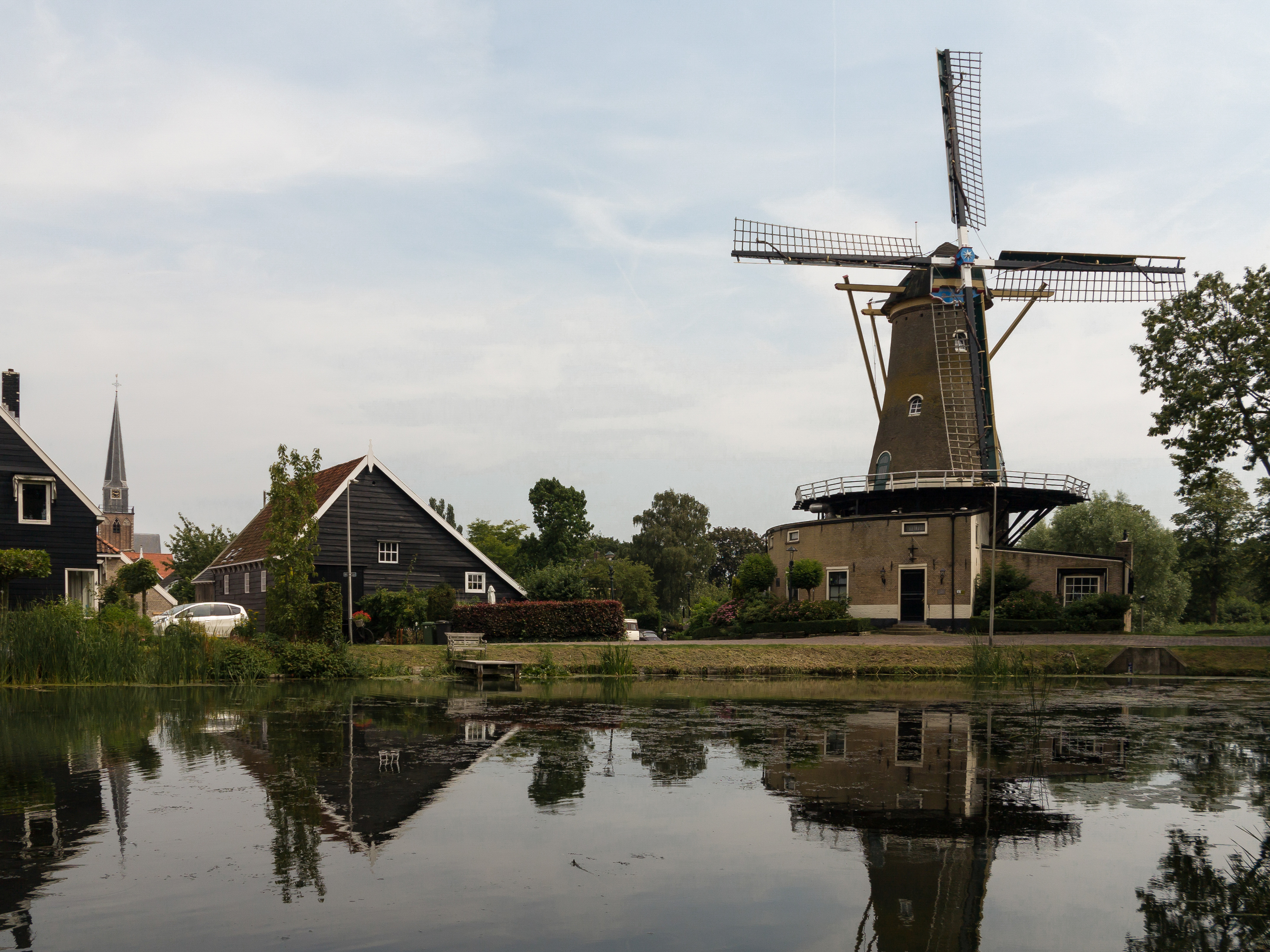
Geervliet, windmill: de Bernissemolen

== Demographics ==
In 2001, the town of Geervliet had 1670 inhabitants. The built-up area of the town was 0.34 km^{2} (0.13 sq mi), and contained 687 residences. The wider statistical district of Geervliet, which covers the entire "Polder Geervliet" has a population of around 2290. This includes the 290 inhabitants of the village Simonshaven.

== Notable residents ==
- Stars Over Foy, DJ and producer
- Cornelis de Witt, Dutch States Navy officer and statesman
- Philippus Baldaeus (1632-1671), Dutch minister

== See also ==
- Schuddebeurs en Simonshaven
