= Tiru Kurippu Thonda Nayanar =

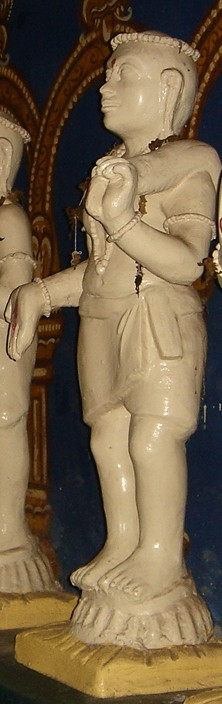

Personal life
- Born: Kanchipuram
- Honors: Nayanar, saint

Religious life
- Religion: Hinduism
- Philosophy: Shaivism, Bhakti

Tiru Kurippu Thonda Nayanar or Thiru Kurippu Thonda Nayanar (Tamil: திருக்குறிப்புத் தொண்ட நாயனார், Tirukkuṟipput Toṇṭa Nāyaṉār) is one of the Nayanars, 63 devotees to the Hindu god Shiva who are revered as saints in Shaivism. His life is recorded in traditional hagiographies like Periya Puranam (13th century CE), Tirutoṇṭar Antādi (10th century CE) and Thiruthondar Thogai (8th century CE). The saint was serving the Shiva devotees by reading their facial expressions and understanding their actual needs. This service earned him the name Tiru Kurippu Thonda Nayanar: Thiru is an honorific term in Tamil; Kurippu means "expressions" in general, and "facial expressions" in particular; and Thondar means "voluntary servant".

== Biography ==
Tiru Kurippu Thonda Nayanar was born in a Vannar family at Kanchipuram, the ancient capital of the Pallava dynasty, which is located 76 km south-west of Tamil Nadu's modern capital of Chennai. This religious centre of South India is regarded as one of the seven holiest cities for the Hindus in India, and is also considered the land of devotees, poets, philanthropists, saints, and savants.

The saint was a single minded staunch devotee of Shiva and served the devotees of Shiva by reading the faces of Nayanars. He derived utmost satisfaction in washing the clothes of Saiva devotees. The devotees of Shiva appreciated the selfless washing services of the saint and considered him as the selfless launderer. He was not only physically washing the dirt from clothes but also spiritually washing the three blemishes of the human being. Shiva decided to relieve Tiru Kurippu Thonda Nayanar from the miseries of rebirth and wanted him to bless with salvation. Before this he wanted the Nayanars to go through tough times and wanted to put saint's devotion and faith by trials and testing.

On an eventful day, Shiva appeared before the saint in the guise of a ripened Saiva devotee with thin frame and wearing old and dirty rags. The saint stopped him and volunteered to wash his rags. The old devotee also agreed that the clothes deserve good washing. However he also claimed that the clothes are the only possession and it protected him against the chilly weather during night time. Therefore the old devotee insisted that the clothes need to be duly washed and delivered before sunset. Tiru Kurippu Thonda, without hesitation, agreed to complete the washing service before evening. The poor man even left a warning: if the washing is delayed, the act of delay would harm his body. At that time there was enough sunlight and therefore the saint was hoping to complete the service before sunset.

All of a sudden the climate become cloudy till evening and soon there was heavy rain. The saint was developing the signs of desperation and hopelessness. Soon he was wailing and weeping with grief. Even he felt guilty and attempted to break his head on the washing stone. The devotion and faith of Tiru Kurippu Thonda Nayanar melted Shiva and he appeared before him and valued his act with benign grace. The determination shown by the saint earned him a place in the abode of Shiva.

During the Tamil month Chithrai, the nakshatra (also known as nakshatram) (transl. lunar mansion) of Swathi is observed as Tiru Kurippu Thonda Nayanar's puja day in all Shiva temples.
