= Nathu (name) =

Nathu (Hindustani नत्थू, نتھو, also rendered Nathoo) is a Gujarati name.

== Origin and demography ==
The name is borne by both Hindus and Muslims, as both a given name and as a surname. It is judged by the Oxford Dictionary of Family Names in Britain and Ireland to be of 'unexplained' origin. As of about 2016, 155 people bore the name as a surname in the spelling Nathoo and 63 in the spelling Nathu in Great Britain, and none in Ireland.

== People and characters named Nathu ==
=== As a given name ===
- Nathoo, long-lost son of Messua in The Jungle Book.
- Nathu Dhobi, Punjabi freedom-fighter
- Nathu Khan (1920–1971), Pakistani sarangi player
- Nathu Singh (cricketer) (born 1995), Indian cricketer
- Nathu Singh Gurjar (born 1951), Indian politician
- Nathu Singh Rathore (1900–?), Indian Army officer

=== As a surname ===
- Anup Nathu (born 1960), New Zealand cricketer
