= Schuddebeurs en Simonshaven =

Coordinates: 51°49′20″N 4°18′0″E

Schuddebeurs en Simonshaven is a former municipality in the Dutch province of South Holland. It was located about 4 km southwest of the town of Spijkenisse, and covered the two polders Schuddebeurs and Simonshaven, including the (still existing) village of Simonshaven.

The municipality existed between 1817 and 1855, when it became part of Geervliet.
