= M. Ethirajulu =

Indian politician (1919–1970)

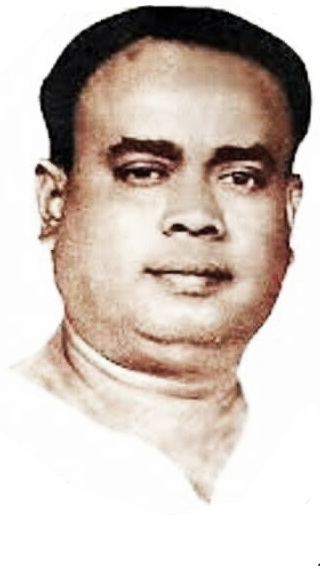
- Born: 19 September 1919; Parangipettai, Cuddalore, India
- Died: 18 September 1970 (aged 50); Cuddalore, Tamil Nadu, India
- Organization: Tamil Nadu Congress
- Spouses: Kovidammal; Aathilakshmi
- Children: Saroja; Kalaivani

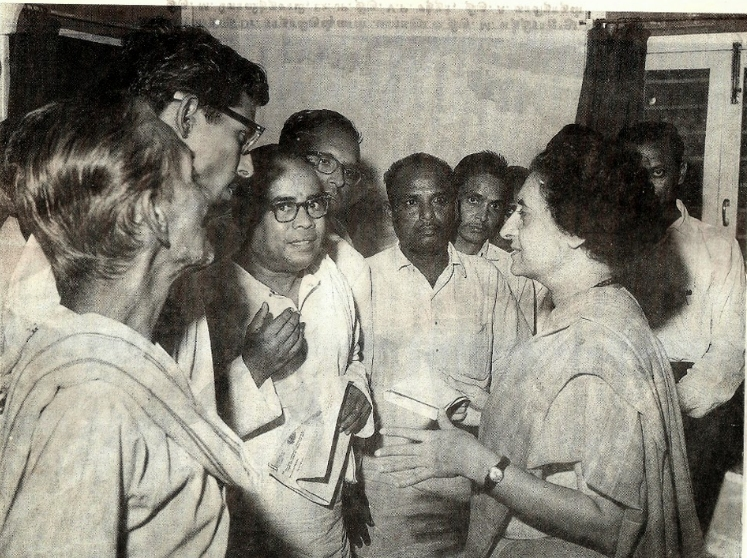
Indira Gandhi with Ethirajalu.

Manickam Ethirajulu (19 September 1919 – 18 September 1970) was an Indian politician. He was a member of the Indian National Congress in Tamil Nadu and was selected thrice as a member of the Madras Legislative Council.

M. Ethirajulu was born in Parangipettai, near Cuddalore, India. He was the son of Manickam and Navammal. He was born to an impoverished family. Their family business did not interest him, but he aspired to have a career similar to that of his cousin Samiyar in Cuddalore. He went to Samiyar's alma mater to study, and in 1937, after his junior high school at Cuddalore, he was the topper in the starting lineup for talent, speed, and agility. Ethirajulu worked in the second world DRP system from 1947-1951, becoming the Tamil Nadu Civil Supplies Corporation inspector.

He died from a heart attack in September 1970.
