= Chintamoni Dhoba =

Ruler of West Bangal, India

- Chintamoni Dhoba
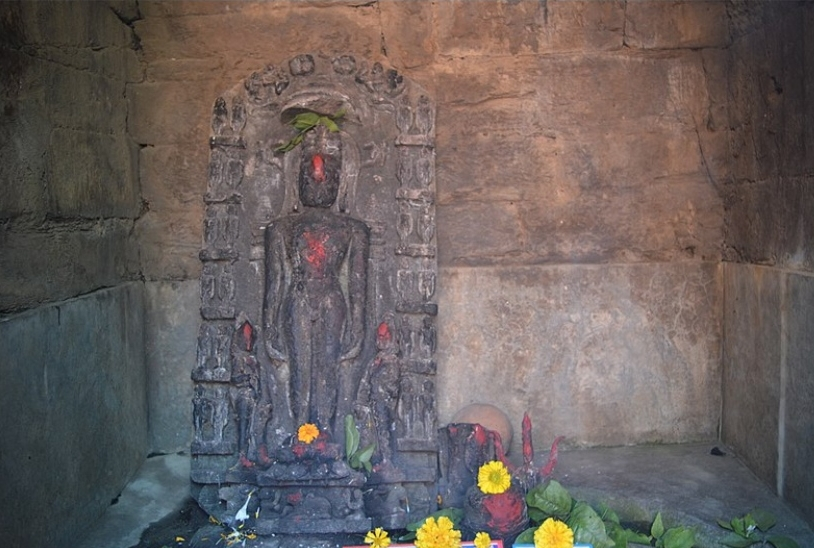
- Predecessor: Anantavarman Chodaganga of Eastern Ganga dynasty
- Died: 1300AD
- Religion: Jainism

Chintamoni Dhoba (died 1300AD), was ruler of Dhalbhum region and established capital at Ambikanagar (now in Bankura). Chintamoni belonged to the Dhobi caste. The 'pai' or grain measure used in these parganas was for a long time called 'Chintamon pai'.

== See also ==
- Dhalbhum
- Ghatsila
