= Neelasothaiyan =

Commander-in-Chief of King Periyathambiran

- Neelasothaiyan
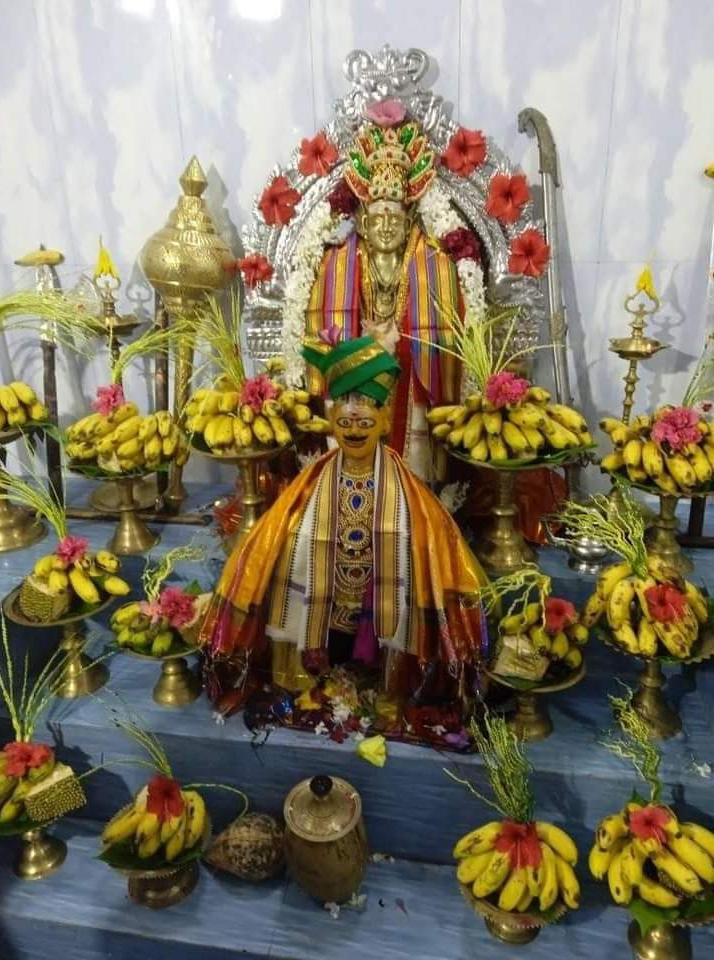
- Successor: 9th century
- Born: Sri Lanka
- Religion: Hinduism

Neelasothaiyan Commander-in-Chief of King Periyathambiran who ruled the city of Valavai, that he was born in the Vannar clan and conquered the Pandyas and conquered 6000 warriors in his army and ruled their country.
