= Chakali Ilamma =

Indian revolutionary leader

Chakali Illama
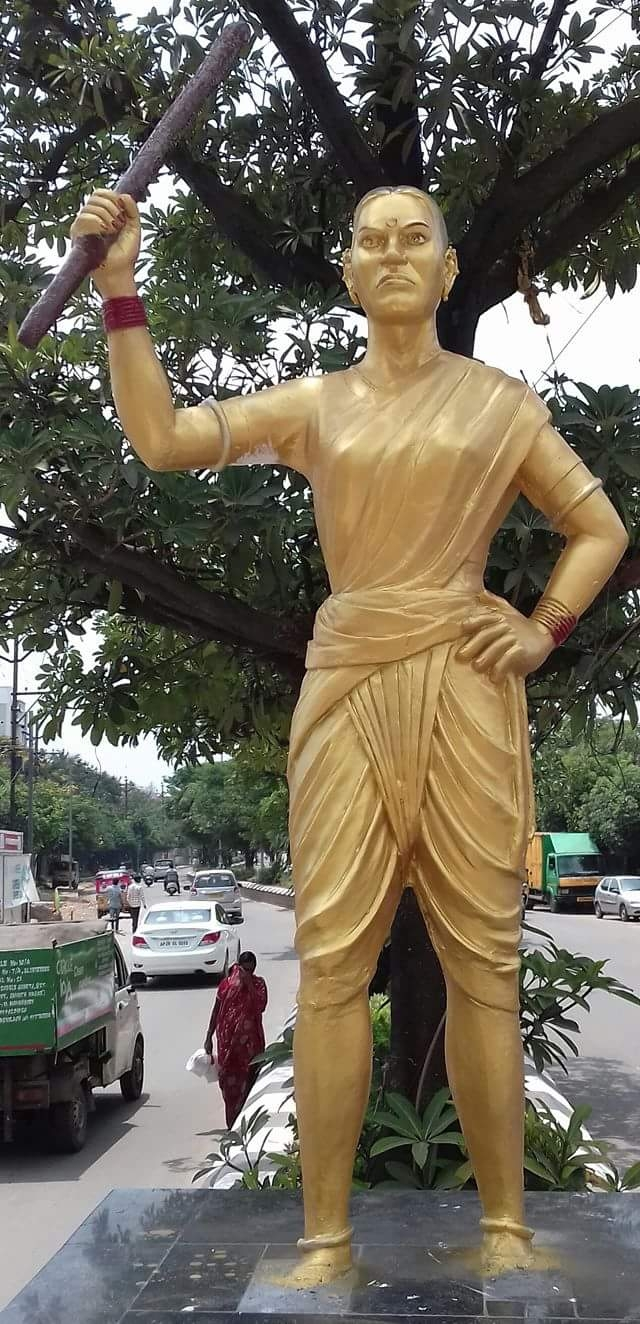
- Chakali Illama Statue

Personal details
- Born: Chityala Ailamma c. 1895 Kistapuram, Warangal district, Hyderabad State (present-day Telangana, India)
- Died: 10 September 1985 (aged 89) Palakurthi, Andhra Pradesh (now Telangana), India
- Party: Communist Party of India
- Spouse: Chityala Narasimah (m. 1906)
- Children: 5

Chityala Ilamma (née Oruganti) (c. 1895 – 10 September 1985), better known as Chakali Ilamma, was an Indian revolutionary leader during the Telangana Rebellion. Her act of defiance against Zamindar Ramachandra Reddy, known as Visnoor Deshmukh, to cultivate her land, became an inspiration for many during the rebellion against the feudal lords of the Telangana region.She revolted against the zamindar struggles of Visnoor

== Early and personal life ==
Chityala Ilamma was born in 1895 September 25 as the fourth child of Oruganti Mallamma and Sailu in Kistapuram of Warangal district, of present-day Telangana, India. She belongs to Rajaka caste.

Ilamma was married to Chityala Narasimah at the age of 11. The couple had four sons and a daughter.

== Career ==
Ilamma took the red flag against the anarchy of Deshmukh and Razakar in Visnur between 1940 and 1944.

She joined the Andhra Mahasabha as well as the Communist Party of India. She worked actively against the Nizam government and her house was the center for activities conducted against the feudal land lords who collaborated with the Nizam.

== Death ==
Ilamma died on 10 September 1985 at Palakurthi due to illness.
