= Hēna =

Minority Sinhalese caste

Hēna, also Radā, is a minority Sinhalese caste. "Rajas" means dirt in Sinhala and Pali or Sanskrit and "Rajaka" means the removers of dirt. Earlier these people collected clothes by traveling home to home, however in the present context those practices have been obsolete in Sri Lanka. Presently, people of this caste have ranked up in competitive professions. Of most are Scientists, Professors, Lawyers, Actors, and Politicians in Sri Lanka and Overseas (including foreign born citizens with Sri Lankan heritage).

== British period ==
The creation of the above Mudaliyar class by the British in the 19th century, its restriction only to the Govigama caste, production of spurious caste hierarchy lists by this class and changes to the land tenure system, resulted in this caste too being classified as a low caste during this period. Although contrary to history, some modern Govigama historians even go to the extent to now suggest that this caste was traditionally bound to serve the Govi caste.

The influential Mudaliyar class attempted to keep this caste and all other Sri Lankan castes out of colonial appointments. The oppression by the Mudaliars and connected headmen extended to demanding subservience, service and even restrictions on the type of personal names that could be used by this community. These had been barbaric community standards prevailed, despite the so-called ‘humane’ social reformations by the Buddhist influence.

Despite the above odds, several members of this caste became pioneer Ship chandlers, commercial Laundry operators and successful Merchants during the British period and were recognised as members of the local elite.

== Modern period ==
Currently, most Sri Lankans of this community are in all the leading professions within the country and overseas (i.e., USA, Canada, UK) involved with Science (i.e., Chemistry, Agriculture, Engineering, Medicine), Commerce, Arts and several other disciplines. They are known to make positive contributions and progress as great professionals. Presently, they also gain an increased say in modern Sri Lankan politics, mainly through the alternative political party Janatha Vimukthi Peramuna as the leadership selection processes within the two main political parties are not democratic.

Despite philosophical values in Buddhism, caste discrimination by the Buddhist monastic establishment hinders the authentic identity of successful individuals. For instance, the majority of this people live with amended surnames in fear of social disparity besides their professional status.

== In literature ==
- Senkottan-Novel written by Mahinda Kumara Masimbula
- "Lenchina mage nangiye" song

== Notable people ==
- Ranasinghe Premadasa - Sri Lankan 3rd President (1989-1993) and prime minister (1978-1989)
- Chakali ailamma - Chakali Ailamma (1919–1985) was an Indian revolutionary leader during the Telangana Rebellion. Her act of defiance against Zamindar Ramachandra Reddy, known as Visnoor Deshmukh, to cultivate her land became an inspiration for many during the rebellion against the feudal lords of the Telangana region.
- Madivala Machideva - Madivala Machideva, also known as Veera Ganachari Madivala Machideva, was an Indian warrior of the 12th-century.

== See also ==
- Dhobi
- Vannar
