= Shyamji Kanojia =

Indian cricketer (died 2021)

Personal information
- Born: Mumbai, Maharashtra, India
- Died: 3 January 2021 (aged 65); Virar, Mumbai

Domestic team information
- Years: Team
- Railways cricket team

Career statistics
Competition	FC
Matches	4
Runs scored	23
Batting average	7.66
100s/50s	0/0
Top score	7
Balls bowled	6
Wickets	0
Bowling average	-
5 wickets in innings	0
10 wickets in match	0
Best bowling	-
Catches/stumpings	1/0
- Source: Cricinfo, 4 January 2021

Shyamji Kanojia (1955/56 – 3 January 2021) was an Indian cricketer who played for Railways in four first-class matches during the 1976–77 Ranji Trophy.

== Death ==
He died on 3 January 2021 at the age of 65 due to a heart attack while playing in a senior veterans cricket match in Virar. It was reported that he played in the match amid severe chest pain and died on the ground while fielding.
