= Arumuka Navalar =

Sri Lankan Shaivism and Tamil language scholar, reformer, revivalist

Arumuga Navalar
- ஆறுமுக நாவலர்
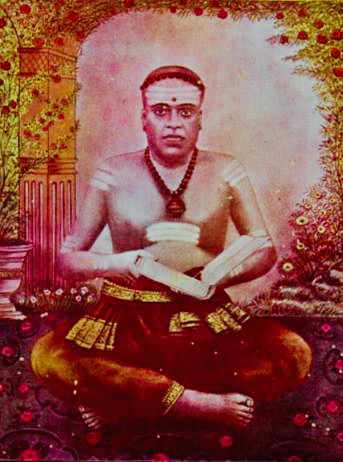
- Born: Kandharpillai Arumukapillai; 18 December 1822; Nallur, Jaffna District, British Ceylon
- Died: 5 December 1879 (aged 56); Jaffna, British Ceylon
- Other names: Srila Sri Arumuka Navalar; Sri Arumuka Swamigal
- Education: Tamil Pandithar
- Occupation: Hindu missionary
- Known for: Hindu reformer
- Title: Navalar

Arumuka Navalar (Tamil: ஆறுமுக நாவலர், romanized: Āṟumuka Nāvalar, lit. 'Arumuka the Orator'; 18 December 1822 – 5 December 1879) was a Sri Lankan Shaivite Tamil language scholar and a religious reformer who was central in reviving native Hindu Tamil traditions in Sri Lanka and India.

Navalar's birth name was Nallur Arumuka Pillai. He was born in a Tamil literary family, and became one of the Jaffna Tamils notable for reviving, reforming and reasserting the Hindu Shaivism tradition during the colonial era. As an assistant working for Peter Percival – a Methodist Christian missionary, he helped translate the King James Bible into the Tamil language. He established Hindu schools and published a press in order to publish reading materials for Hindu children to educate them on Hindu religion and also practice and rituals of Hindu religion. With his knowledge of Christian theological premises, Navalar became influential in creating a period of intense religious rivalry with Christian missionaries, defending Tamils and their historic religious culture in India and Sri Lanka, preventing large-scale conversions to Christianity.

He was one of the first natives to use the modern printing press to preserve the Tamil literary tradition. He defended Hindu Shaivism, calling it samaya (Observance, Religion) of "True Being" (sat, soul), and he used the same techniques to counter Christianity that Christian missionaries used against Hinduism. As part of his religious revivalism, in a manner similar to Christian mission schools, he built schools that taught secular and Hindu religious subjects. He is credited with finding and publishing original palm leaf manuscripts. He also attempted to reform Hindu Shaivism and customary practices in Sri Lanka, such as by showing Shaiva Agamas (scriptures) prohibit animal sacrifice and violence of any form.

== Biography ==
Navalar was born in 1822 as Nallur Arumuga Pillai to a Hindu family in Sri Lanka. His family belonged to the Vellalar caste, which constitutes about 50% of the Tamil Hindus on the island nation. The Vellalars were related to farming. Historically, the Vellalars had been a part of the elites who owned lands, were literati, patrons of temples and monasteries. At the time of Navalar's birth, they were a part of the socio-political leadership in Jaffna Peninsula, a strip of land (40 by 15 miles) separated from South India by the Palk Strait. Navalar grew up in a literati Tamil Shaiva family.

Navalar's home was in the town of Nallur on the Jaffna Peninsula. The principal town Jaffna and the peninsula (as well as the West Coast and Eastern regions of Sri Lanka) were predominantly Tamil Saiva in culture distinct from that of the Sinhalese Buddhists elsewhere. It was closely linked to the Saiva culture of South India. It was also home to the Jaffna Kingdom that had patronised this culture before it was defeated by the Portuguese colonials in 1621 CE. Nallur was also the capital of the defeated kingdom.

Arumugam's father Kandharpillai was a Tamil poet and provided a foundation in Tamil literature to Arumuga Navalar. His mother Sivakami was known for her devotion to supreme Saiva deity Lord Siva. Arumugam studied the Indian classical language, Sanskrit as well as Tamil grammar. Arumugam studied English in a Christian mission run school as a day student. After his studies, he was asked to stay on at the Jaffna Central College to teach English and Tamil. The missionary school principal, Peter Percival employed him to assist in the translation of the King James Bible and other Christian literature into Tamil to further their missionary reach and objectives.

Navalar immersed himself in the study of the Bible as well as the Vedas, Agamas and Puranas. When he started his studies, he wondered whether Shaiva Hinduism or Christianity was the right path. After his studies, he became convinced that the Shaiva religious tradition in the Vedas and Agamas was the right path, and that the Christian path wasn't. Arumugam Navalar felt that Hindu Saivites needed a clearer understanding of their own ancient literature and religion. He continued to help the Christian missionaries but resolved to challenge the theological ideas of these missionaries, as well as launch reforms and spread the original ideas of Shaivism. Navalar left his job under Peter Percival that he had with the Wesleyan Mission, although Percival offered him a higher salary to stay on. He decided not to marry and relinquished his patrimony and did not get any money from his four employed brothers. From then until the end of his life, he and his projects were supported by those who believed in his cause.

Through his weekly sermons at Hindu temples, he also attempted to reform local Tamils of all practices that did not find sanction in the Hindu Vedas and Agamas. The lecture series and its circuit continued regularly for several years and produced a Saiva revival, helping informed piety grow among many Jaffna Saivas. This was a direct tactical response to confront what he called the "mockery" of the Hindus by Christian missionaries. During this period, he continued to assist Percival to complete the translation of the Bible, as well as his study of the primary texts of both Christianity and Hinduism. When there was a conflict as to Percival's version and another competing translation, Arumugam traveled to Madras to defend Percival's version. In 1848 he founded his own school and finally parted company with Percival. Navalar believed that the Christian missionaries should be viewed as a gift from Shiva to help awaken his community to discover their own dharma path (puram) from "which they had departed" and away from the path of the "barbaric Europeans" (purappuram), states Hudson.

== Background information ==
Tamil people are natives in Tamil Nadu. Tamilakam (ancient Tamil country) had followers of Hinduism, Buddhism and Jainism. The Hinduism, Tamil and Sanskrit has been spread by priests, traders to Southeast Asia. By the 12th century CE, the Tamils had an extensive network of temples, religious literature and pilgrimage sites dedicated to Shaivism and Vaishnavism Of these, the Shaiva samayam (religious tradition) was most influential in the Jaffna region. They held the Vedas and Agamas to be the bedrock of their beliefs. Navalar was born and raised in this background.

The 18th and 19th century Tamils in India and Sri Lanka found themselves in the midst of intrusive Christian missionary activity and their polemics against Hinduism. According to D. Dennis Hudson, Tamil Saivas opposed Christian missions from the earliest days, based on indirect literary evidence. Printing press was not available to the Hindus in colonial era South Asia, and the Shaiva community used their oral tradition and handwritten notes for anti-missionary literature. Once Hindus gained access to printing presses, they mass-produced religious literature to condemn Christian propaganda in Jaffna and Chennai (then Madras) in the same way that Christian missionaries had used mass-produced literature to attack Hinduism. Arumuga Navalar was one of the first Tamils who became adept at this information war, and to undertake as his life's career the intellectual and institutional response of Saivism to Christianity in Sri Lanka and India.

The 19th century Protestant missionaries from England and America in Jaffna believed that Hindu Shaivism was "evil" and in the struggle God and the Devil, they began to use publications such as The Morning Star to reveal the "falsity" of Hindu Shaivism and highlight texts such as the Skanda Purana in their schools for children. This angered the Shaiva community, who began their own efforts to counter the methods of the Christians.

=== Response to Protestant propaganda ===
In September 1842 two hundred Hindu men gathered at a Siva temple monastery. The group decided to open up a school to study Vedas and Agamas. The group also decided to start a press with the help of resident Eurasian Burghers. Arumugam Navalar who was part of the organisation wrote about the meeting in The Morning Star in a sympathetic tone.

When I heard the teachings by the gurus of the Christian path, my mind was very sympathetic and changed and I thought for a time that the Tamil sect might be false and the Christian true, and so I studied the Vedagama called the Bible.

— Arumuka Navalar, Quoted by D. Dennis Hudson

While Arumugam Navalar was still working under Peter Percival and translating the Bible, he published a seminal letter in The Morning Star under a pseudonym in September 1841. It was a comparative study of Christianity and Hindu Saivism and targeted the weakness in the argument Christian missionaries had used against local Hindu Saiva practices. The missionaries had attacked the idol worship and temple rituals of the local Hindu Saivas as "devilish" and of "no value". Navalar, an avid reader of the Bible as he worked to translate it into Tamil, stated that Christianity and Jesus himself were rooted in the temple rituals of the ancient Israelites and that the reverence to the icons of Christianity such as the cross was akin to Shaiva's reverence for the icons of Hinduism such as the lingam. If Christians find their churches, rites and symbols as pedagogically useful, why shouldn't Shaiva Hindus have the same human rights and religious choices, argued Navalar. His letter admonished the missionaries for misrepresenting their own religion and concluded that in effect there was no difference between Christianity and Hindu Saivism as far as idol worship and temple rituals were concerned.

=== Circuit preaching ===
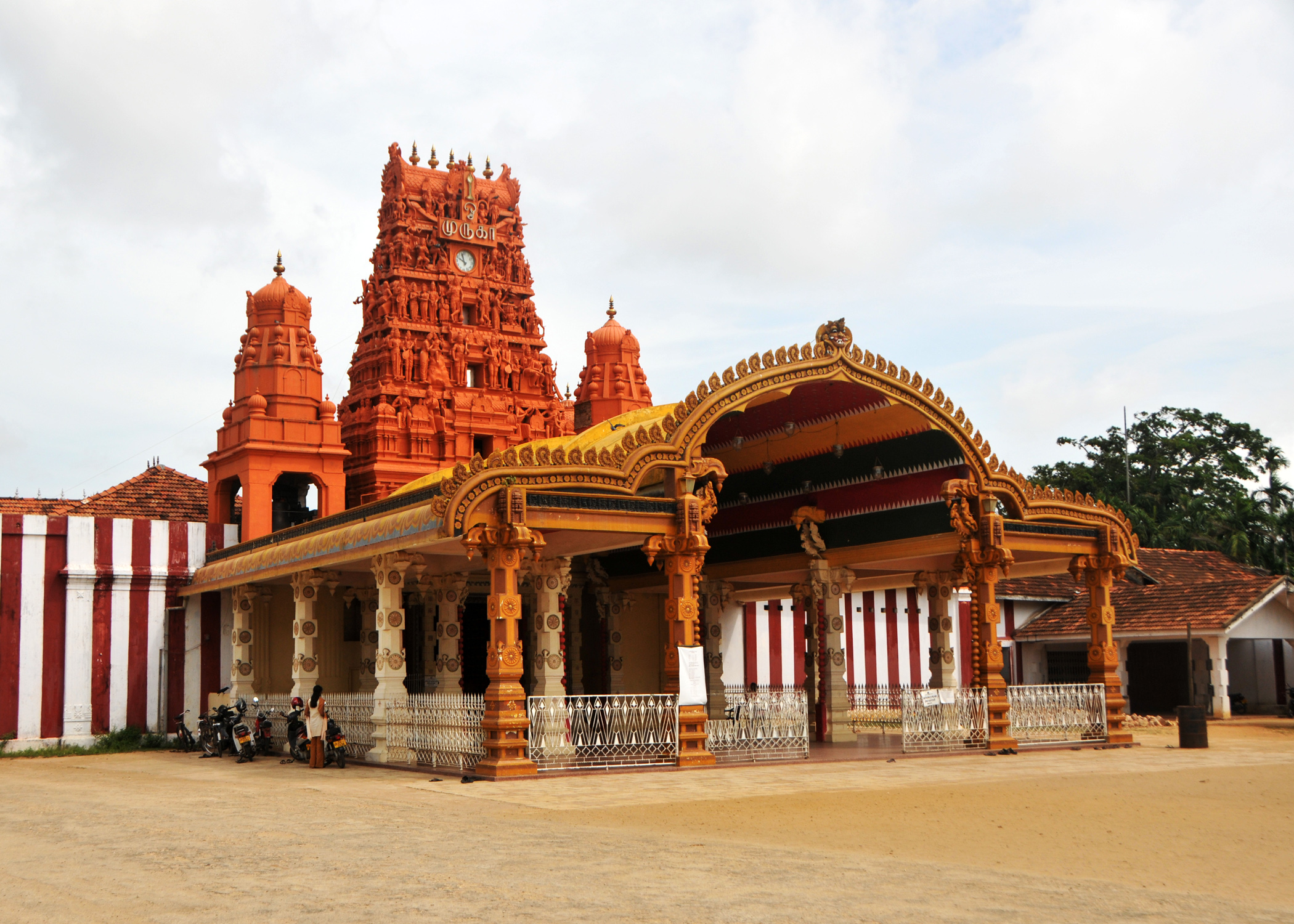
The popular Nallur Kandaswamy Kovil in Jaffna, destroyed in the late 15th century by the Portuguese and rebuilt in 1750 was targeted by Navalar as built not according to Agamic requirements

Using the preaching methods popularised by the Methodist preachers, he became a circuit preacher. His first secession was on 31 December 1847 at Vaitheeswaran Temple in Vannarpannai. It was a weekly event known as Prasangams on every Friday evening. In these secession he read from sacred texts and then preached in a manner that lay people understood. He was helped by his friend Karttikeya Aiyar of Nallur and his students from his school. The sermon topics were mostly ethical, liturgical, and theological and included the evils of adultery, drunkenness, the value of non-killing, the conduct of women, the worship of the linga, the four initiations, the importance of giving alms, of protecting cows, and the unity of God.

=== Emphasis on Agamas ===
In his weekly sermons, he attacked Christians and criticized the benighted practices of local Hindus. He specifically reprimanded the trustees and priests of the Nallur Kandaswami Temple in his home town because they had built the temple not according to the Agamas a century ago as well as used priests who were not initiated in the Agamas. He also opposed their worship of Vel or the weapon representing the main deity as it did not have Agamic sanction.

=== Reformed school system ===
The school he founded was called Saivaprakasa Vidyasala or School of Lord Siva's splendor. The school did not follow the traditional Tamil teaching system, in which each student worked on his own pace and the teacher pupil ratio was extremely low. Although this system produced stellar experts in subject matter but took too much labour and was inefficient compared to the western system used by the Missionaries. He developed his teaching methods based on the exposure he had with the Missionaries. He developed the curriculum to be able to teach 20 students at a time and included secular subject matters and English. He also wrote the basic instruction materials for different grades in Saivism. Most of his teachers were friends and acquaintances who were volunteers. This school system was duplicated later in Chidambaram in India in 1865 and it still exits. But the school system he founded in Sri Lanka was replicated and over 100 primary and secondary schools were built based on his teaching methods. This school system produced numerous students who had clearer understanding of their religion, textual foundations, rituals and theology.

=== Navalar title ===
As an owner of a pioneering new school with the a need for original publications in Tamil prose to teach subjects for all grades, Arumugar Navalar felt a need for a printing press. He and his colleague Sadasiva Pillai went to Madras, India in 1849 to purchase a printing press. On the way they stopped at Thiruvaduthurai Adheenam in Tanjavur, India, an important Saiva monastery. He was asked by the head of the monastery to preach. After listening to his preaching and understanding his unusual mastery of the knowledge of Agamas, the head of the monastery conferred on him the title Navalar (learned). This honorary degree from a prestigious Saiva monastery enhanced his position amongst Saivas and he was known as the Navalar since then.

=== Literary contributions ===
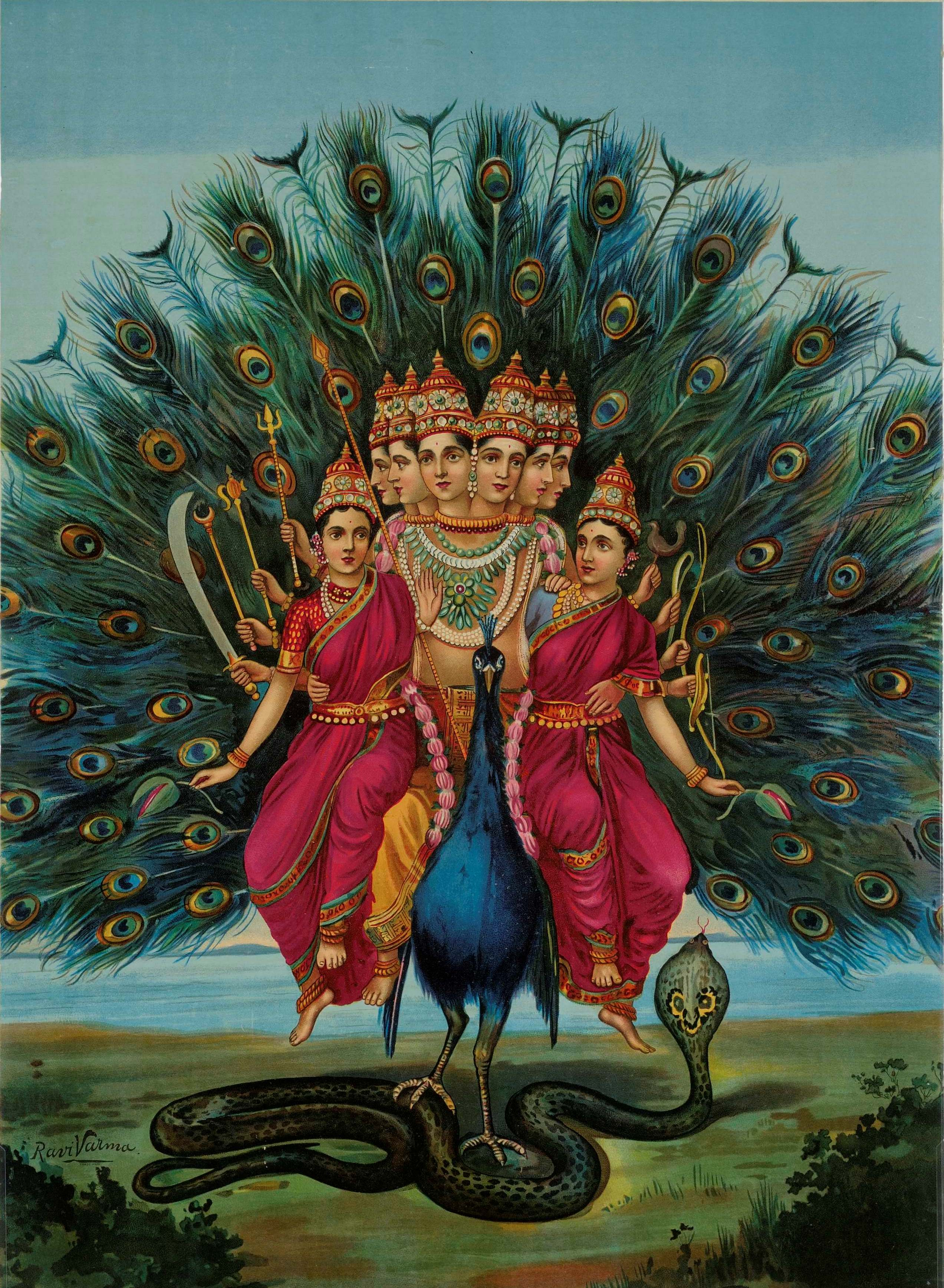
Murugan with his two wives. Arumuka Navalar published the Tirumurukarrupatai, a devotional poem dedicated to Murugan.

While in India he published two texts, one was an educational tool (teachers guide) Cüdãmani Nikantu, a sixteenth-century lexicon of simple verses and Soundarya Lahari, a Sanskrit poem in praise of the Primeval Mother Goddess Parvati, geared towards devotion. These were the first effort at editing and printing Tamil works for Hindu Saiva students and devotees. His press was set up in a building that was donated by a merchant of Vannarpannai. It was named the Vidyaanubalana yantra sala (Preservation of Knowledge Press). The initial publications included Bala Patam (Lessons for Children) in 1850 and 1851. They were graded readers, simple in style, similar in organisation to those used in the Protestant schools. This was followed up by a third volume in 1860 and 1865. It consisted of thirty-nine advanced essays in clear prose, discussing subjects such as God, Saul, The Worship of God, Crimes against the Lord, Grace, Killing, Eating meat, Drinking liquor, Stealing, Adultery, Lying, Envy, Anger, and Gambling. These editions were in use in 2007.

Other notable texts published included The Prohibition of Killing, Manual of worship of Shiva temple and The Essence of the Saiva Religion. His first major literary publication appeared in 1851, the 272-page prose version of Sekkilar's Periya Puranam, a retelling of the 12th-century hagiography of the Nayanars or Saivite saints. In 1853 he published Nakkirar's Tirumurukarrupatai, with its own commentary. It was a devotional poem to Sri Murugan. This was followed by local missionaries attacking Sri Murugan as an "immoral deity" for marrying two women. As a response Navalar published Radiant Wisdom explaining how the chronicles embody differing levels of meaning and that numerous characters in the Christian Bible, like King David, who were being claimed as examples of good conduct by the missionaries, were being depicted as having multiple wives and sexual partners themselves. He also published literature of controversial nature, in a manner similar to how Christian missionaries were, in what Navalar called as "mocking" the Hindus. He along with Centinatha Aiyar, published examples of indecent language from the Bible and published it as Disgusting Things in the Bible (Bibiliya Kutsita). In 1852, he along with Ci. Vinayakamurtti Cettiyar of Nallur, printed the Kummi Song on Wisdom of Muttukumara Kavirajar. The local Christians called for the one-sided censorship of such criticism and to shut down these printing presses.

The seminal work that was geared towards stemming the tide of conversions was printed in 1854. It was a training manual for the use of Saivas in their opposition to the missionaries, titled "Saiva Dhoosana Pariharam".

A Methodist missionary, who had worked in Jaffna, described the manual thirteen years after it had appeared as:

"Displaying an intimate and astonishing acquaintance with the Holy Bible. (the author) labors cleverly to show that the opinions and ceremonies of Jehovah's ancient people closely resembled those of Shaivism, and were neither more nor less Divine in their origin and profitable in their entertainment and pursuit. The notion of merit held by the Hindus, their practices of penance, pilgrimage, and lingam-worship, their ablutions, invocations, and other observances and rites, are cunningly defended on the authority of our sacred writings! That a great effect was thus produced in favour of Sivaism and against Christianity cannot be denied".

This manual was widely used in Sri Lanka and India; it was reprinted at least twice in the 19th century, and eight times by 1956.

== Legacy ==
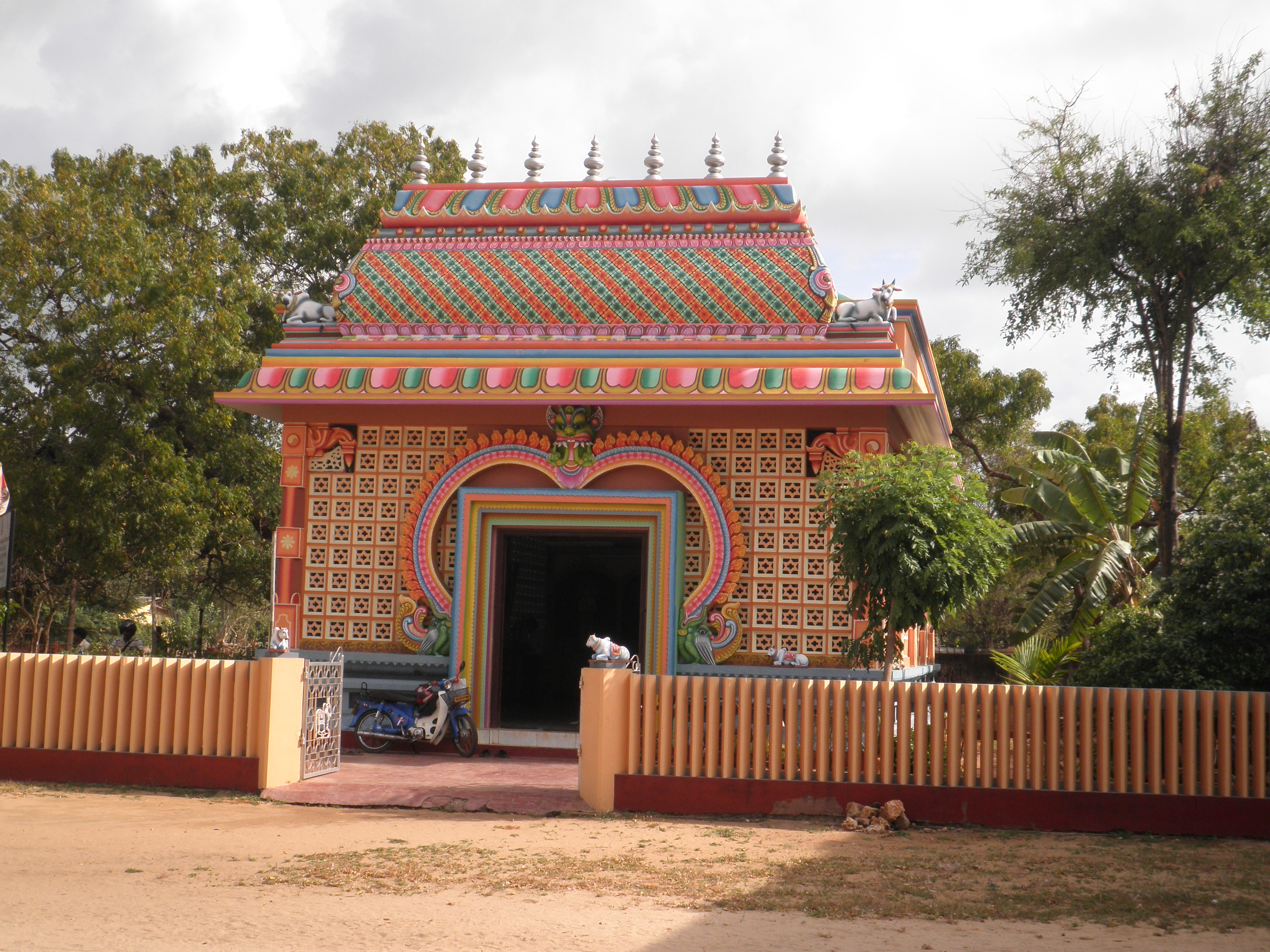
Arumuka Navalar Memorial hall near Nallur Kandaswamy temple, Jaffna

According to D. Dennis Hudson – a World Religions scholar, Navalar's legacy began in Jaffna, but spread more broadly to Sri Lanka as well as Southern India. Navalar active efforts to set up two centres of reform made him influential in the Tamil community. He started two schools, two printing presses and campaigned against Christian missionary activity in colonial-era Jaffna and Madras Presidency. He produced approximately ninety-seven Tamil publications, twenty-three were his own creations, eleven were commentaries, and forty were his editions of those works of grammar, literature, liturgy, and theology that were not previously available in print. With this recovery, editing, and publishing of ancient works, Navalar laid the foundations for the recovery of lost Tamil classics that other Tamil scholars such as U. V. Swaminatha Iyer and C.W. Thamotharampillai continued. He was the first person to deploy the prose style in the Tamil language and according to Tamil scholar Kamil Zvelebil in style it bridged the medieval to the modern.

Navalar established the world's first Hindu school adapted to the modern needs that succeeded and flourished. While the school he established in Chidamharam in 1865 has survived to this day, similar schools seem to have spread only to two nearby towns. In Sri Lanka, eventually more than one hundred and fifty primary and secondary schools emerged from his work. Many of the students of these schools were successful in defending the Hindu Saiva culture not only against Christian missionary activities but also against neo-Hindu sects. His reforms and contributions were added to by scholars such as V. Kalyanasundaram (1883–1953), and Maraimalai Adigal (1876–1950), who developed their own schools of theology within the Hindu Saiva heritage. Although it is difficult to quantify as to how many Hindus may have converted to Protestant Christianity without his intervention but according to Bishop Sabapathy Kulendran, the low rate of conversion compared to the initial promise was due to Navalar's activities.

Arumuka Navalar who identified himself with an idealised past, worked within the traditions of Hindu Saiva culture and adhered to the Hindu Saiva doctrine. He was an unapologetic defender of Hindu Shaivism. Although he never cared much for his caste identity, as he considered all living beings as equal, his efforts led to the consolidation of traditional privileges of Hindu Saiva Vellala (farmers, landlords) and Karaiyar (warriors). Although Navalar did not show much interest in Tamil politics and kept his focus on defending the Hindu Shaiva faith in Sri Lanka and South India, his aggressive preaching of a Hindu Saiva cultural heritage contributed to the growth Tamil nationalism. The Tamil nationalist movement had an element that "Hindu Saiva Siddhanta preceded all others as the original Tamil religion", states Dennis Hudson. Navalar's insistence on the Agamas as the criteria of Hindu Saiva worship, moreover, gave momentum to the tendency among Tamils everywhere to attempt to subsume local deities under the Agamic pantheon and to abandon animal sacrifice altogether.

Navalar and his followers have been accused by some such as Sivathamby of focusing on the religious literature "in their anxiety", and "openly keeping away" from the secular Tamil literature, as they opposed the Christian missionaries. According to David Shulman, however, Navalar was among the pioneers who first located and printed the predominantly non-religious Tamil Sangam literature in 1851 (Thirumurukaattuppadai, one of the Ten Idylls) and the earliest paper editions of a palm-leaf manuscript on the ancient Tamil grammar text, Tolkappiyam. According to Kamil Zvelebil – a Tamil literature scholar, Navalar was one of the key persons who identified, edited and published the secular and religious classical Tamil literature before 1879. He also inspired his fellow Tamils to publish Hindu texts and their translations.

His critics state that Navalar was an example of a "hegemonic caste" and his hidden agenda was to promote his own caste. Arumuga Navalar found support from the Brahmins and his own literati caste of Vellalas in the Tamil community, according to Wilson, because he accepted and recognized their caste-based status. His supporters state that Navalar had no such hidden agenda, and his active efforts to reform attest to Navalar's commitment to end social vices such as alcoholism, violence against animals and others. According to Peter Schalk, Navalar has also been accused of despising the Vaishnava and Jaina community.

Navalar's legacy has provoked negative reactions and criticism from the political left of South Asia. Navalar, states Schalk, was a theologian who used indirect "metonymic language" with "coded words" that metaphorically supported the traditional caste system privileges within the colonial era administration. His supporters, in contrast, interpret the same "coded words" differently and view him as an "organic intellectual" committed to religious growth through reforms and one committed to the human rights and freedom struggle of the Tamil people.

== Cited literature ==
- Goodman, Hananya; Hudson, D. Dennis (1994). Between Jerusalem and Benares:Comparative Studies in Judaism and Hinduism. SUNY. ISBN 0-7914-1716-6.
- Gupta, Suman; Basu, Tapan; Chatterjee, Subarno (2010). Globalization in India: Contents and Discontents. Dorling Kindersley. ISBN 978-81-317-1988-6.
- Hellmann-Rajanayagam, Dagmar (1989). "Arumuka Navalar: Religious reformer or national leader of Eelam". Indian Economic and Social History Review. 26 (2): 235–257. doi:10.1177/001946468902600204. S2CID 144692614.
- Jones, Kenneth W.; Hudson, D. Dennis (1992). Religious controversy in British India: dialogues in South Asian languages. SUNY. ISBN 0-7914-0828-0.
- Kaplan, Stephen; Hudson, D. Dennis (1994). Indigenous Responses to Western Christianity. NYU Press. ISBN 0-8147-4649-7.
- Sabaratnam, T (2010). Sri Lankan Tamil Struggle. The Sangam.
- Schalk, Peter (2010). Michael Bergunder, Heiko Frese and Ulrike Schroder (ed.). Ritual, Caste and religion on Colonial South India -Sustaining the pre-colonial paste:Saiva defiance against Christian rule in the 19th century Jaffna. Franckesche Stifungen zu Halle, Halle. ISBN 978-3-447-06377-7.
- Sugirtharajah, Rasiah (2005). The Bible and empire: postcolonial explorations. Cambridge University Press. ISBN 0-521-82493-1.
- Zvelebil, Kamil (1991). Companion studies to the history of Tamil literature. Brill Academic Publishers. ISBN 90-04-09365-6.
- Wikremasinghe, Nira (2006). Sri Lanka in the Modern Age: A History of Contested Identities. University of Hawaii Press. ISBN 0-8248-3016-4.
- Wilson, A.J. (1999). Sri Lankan Tamil Nationalism. UBC. ISBN 0-7748-0759-8.
