= Sri Lankan Pallar =

Agrarian Sri Lankan Tamil caste

Sri Lankan Pallar is a Tamil caste found in northern and eastern Sri Lanka. They are traditionally involved in agriculture and were also involved in toddy tapping and artisanal fishing.

== Etymology ==
The Pallar name may be derived from pallam, which means a pit or low-lying area. This aligns with their traditional occupation of cultivators of the low wetlands. There is literary evidence that suggests that Pallars were traditional farmers who produced large quantities of food grains, and that some were probably rulers in the Tamil region.

The change of name from Mallar to Pallar is thought to have been imposed upon them after the decline of their rule, when the leaders (Nayaks) of competing tribes wanted to suggest a degradation in status.

The caste name is sometimes being spelled as Pallan. The -"an" suffix is originally masculine singular and in colloquial usage often attached when implying disrespect. This usage has been observed for other service castes. The plural and respectable suffix is denoted by -"ar", resulting in the name Pallar, which is the one usually preferred.

== History ==
=== Mythological origin ===
The Pallars of Jaffna expressly conceive themselves to be descended from one of two Vellalar brothers. The property of the younger brother Pallan was destroyed by a storm. The older brother Vellalan gave Pallan shelter. After the death of Vellalan, his wife became the owner of the property and forced Pallan and his family to become agricultural laborers for her.

=== Early period ===
The Sri Lankan Pallar and the Pallars of Tamil Nadu share a common origin. The Pallars traditionally inhabited the fertile Sangam landscape known as Marutham. They were earlier known as Kadaisiyar, tenant farmers on the land of the Uzhavar or Kalamar. The women of this community were noted in Sangam literature for their expertise in paddy transplantation.

=== Medieval period ===
The Pallars migrated to Sri Lanka as serfs accompanied by their chiefs, on whose land they toiled. They migrated in large numbers mainly from Chola country in search of fertile land. Pallars settling in the Jaffna Peninsula, which was rich in Palmyra palm, joined others there involved in toddy tapping. Some Pallars were involved in other occupations, such as fishers, servants in forts, and harvesters of Indigo plant roots, contributing to the famous dye industry of Jaffna Kingdom.

=== Colonial period ===
Under colonial rule, castes such as the Pallars and Nalavars were originally bonded in service to the colonial state. However, the rise of the Sri Lankan Vellalar under Dutch Ceylon reduced the status of these castes from tenant farmers to slaves of the Vellalar. The Pallars and Nalavars were officially considered Adimaikal (a Tamil term for slave or menial labour). Large numbers of Pallars from the Coromandel Coast were summoned as slaves under this period by private individuals to work in tobacco plantation. After the end of slavery with British rule on the island, the Pallars largely remained as laborers and tenants. In the 20th century, the British recruited Pallars from Tamil Nadu to work in their tea estates. The Pallars and Paraiyars constituted over half of these workers and formed a significant part of the Up-country Tamil population.

== Customs ==
The Pallars along with the Nalavars worship the caste deity Annamar. A wooden club is used for offering to the deity, suggesting a warrior cult. Thurumbar serve as dhobi exclusively to the Pallars, Nalavars and Paraiyars. The yoke is used as cattle brand mark by the Pallars.

== See also ==
- Pallar
- Pallu (poetry)
- Kadaiyar
