= Dhobi =

Washerman caste in India

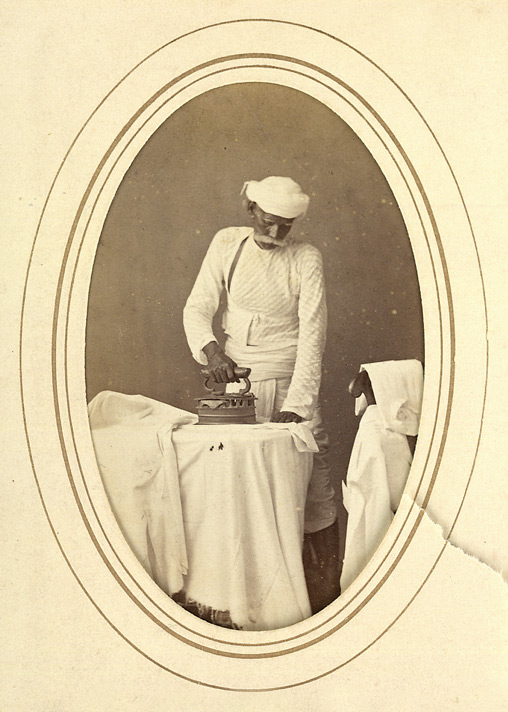
- Carte-de-visite of a Dhobi ironing.

Religion
- Hinduism, Islam and Buddhism

Related ethnic groups
- Muslim Dhobi

Dhobi, known in some places as Dhoba, Rajaka, is a scheduled caste in India and the greater Indian subcontinent whose traditional occupations are washing, ironing, and agricultural labour.

In 2017, Supreme Court of India noted calling people dhobi was offensive.

== Synonyms ==
=== Maharastra ===
In Maharashtra, the Dhobi are found throughout the state, and are also known as Parit. They speak Marathi among themselves, and Hindi with outsiders.

=== Tamil Nadu ===
Vannar belongs to the Valangai ("Right-hand caste faction"). Some of The Valangai comprised castes with an agricultural basis while the Idangai consisted of castes involved in manufacturing, Valangai, which was better organised politically

"Kayvanaval Allitharum and the tiger flag were hoisted
were Identified"

— -Right hand history

In the Tirunelveli region, Thai deities (female deities) are worshipped in large numbers and are worshiped with a pedestal or trident. in states like Karnataka and Andhra Pradesh, Vannars are still the priests of the Mariamman temple

== Demographics ==
State/Territory	Known as	Description	Status
Andhra Pradesh	Rajaka	In Andhra Pradesh, the Rajakas do farming and agriculture, as well as washing, and ironing. However, there are many Rajakas in all sectors, such as doctors, engineers, lawyers, journalists, social services, IT, and politicians.	OBC
Assam	Dhupi	In 2001, Assam's Dhupi population was at 49,929, accounting for 2.7% of the total Scheduled Class (SC) population. A high of 27.9% of this population was urban. The literacy rate among this group was 76%, above both the state figure (66.8%) and the aggregated national figure (54.7%) for SCs.	SC
Bihar	Dhobi, Rajak	According to jangana 2023 Dhobi community in Bihar makes up around 0.84% (11 lakh) Hindu Dhobi, 0.31% (4 lakh) Muslim Dhobi (Qassar) of the state's total population, with maximum concentration in Muzaffarpur, Vaishali, Siwan, Purnia and East Champaran districts, respectively. Bihar's Dhobi community is included in Scheduled Caste from OBC Status due to socioeconomically low. Now, they are in all sectors, but mainly as government employers, doctors, IT engineers, social service, agriculture, farming and politicians. Among the numerically larger castes of SC, Dhobi have registered the highest overall literacy rate.	SC
Jharkhand			SC
Madhya Pradesh		In Madhya Pradesh, Dhobi are a Scheduled Class in the districts of Bhopal, Raisen, and Sehore.	SC and OBC elsewhere
Manipur	Dhupi		SC
Meghalaya	Dhupi		SC
Mizoram	Dhupi		SC
Odisha	Dhoba, Dhobi, Rajak, Rajaka	Odisha has a significant population of Dhobi people in its coastal belt, i.e. eastern Odisha (Cuttack, Puri, Balasore, Ganjam) and a smaller population in its central and western areas. They are included in Scheduled Caste list of Odisha.	SC
Rajasthan			SC
Tripura	Dhoba		SC
Uttar Pradesh	Diwakar, Rajak	The Dhobi population in the state has been classified as SC.	SC
Uttarakhand			SC
Delhi			SC

== Dhobis in Nepal ==
The Central Bureau of Statistics of Nepal classifies the Dhobi as a subgroup within the broader social group of Madheshi Dalits. At the time of the 2011 Nepal census, 109,079 people (0.4% of the population of Nepal) were Dhobi. The frequency of Dhobis by province was as follows:

- Madhesh Province (1.2%)
- Lumbini Province (0.9%)
- Bagmati Province (0.0%)
- Gandaki Province (0.0%)
- Koshi Province (0.0%)
- Karnali Province (0.0%)
- Sudurpashchim Province (0.0%)

The frequency of Dhobis was higher than national average (0.4%) in the following districts:

- Kapilvastu (2.1%)
- Rautahat (2.0%)
- Rupandehi (2.0%)
- Parasi (1.7%)
- Parsa (1.4%)
- Sarlahi (1.3%)
- Bara (1.2%)
- Banke (1.1%)
- Mahottari (1.0%)
- Saptari (0.9%)
- Siraha (0.9%)
- Dhanusha (0.8%)

== Notable people ==
- Ram Chander, recipient of Mahavir Chakra during the Indo-Pakistani War of 1947
- Chintamoni Dhoba, ruler of Dhalbhum region and established capital at Ambikanagar
- Gadge Maharaj, Marathi Hindu saint
- Suryabanshi Suraj, Indian politician

== See also ==
- Dhobi Ghat, Mumbai
- Dhobi Ghat, 2010 movie
- Hēna
