= Periyathambiran =

- Periyatambiran
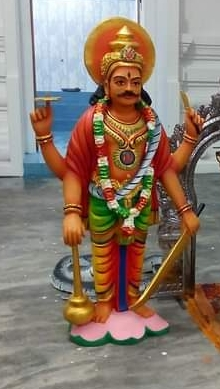
- Successor: 9th century
- Born: Sri Lanka
- Religion: Hinduism

Periyatambiran was a king found in non-Agam village deities, In the eastern part of Sri Lanka, the worship of Periyathambiran is widespread. One of the 17 prisoners who settled in Batticaloa, Worshiped as the deity of the Vannars
