= Nathu Dhobi =

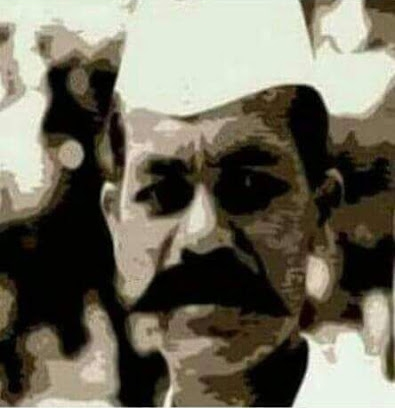
- Born: Punjab, British India
- Movement: Indian independence movement

Amar Shaheed Nathu Dhobi also known as Nathu Dhobi belongs to DHOBHI caste which listed OBC. He was the first freedom fighter to lead the Jallianwala Bagh struggle in the state of Amritsar, Punjab in 1919.
