= Palakurthi =

- Census Town
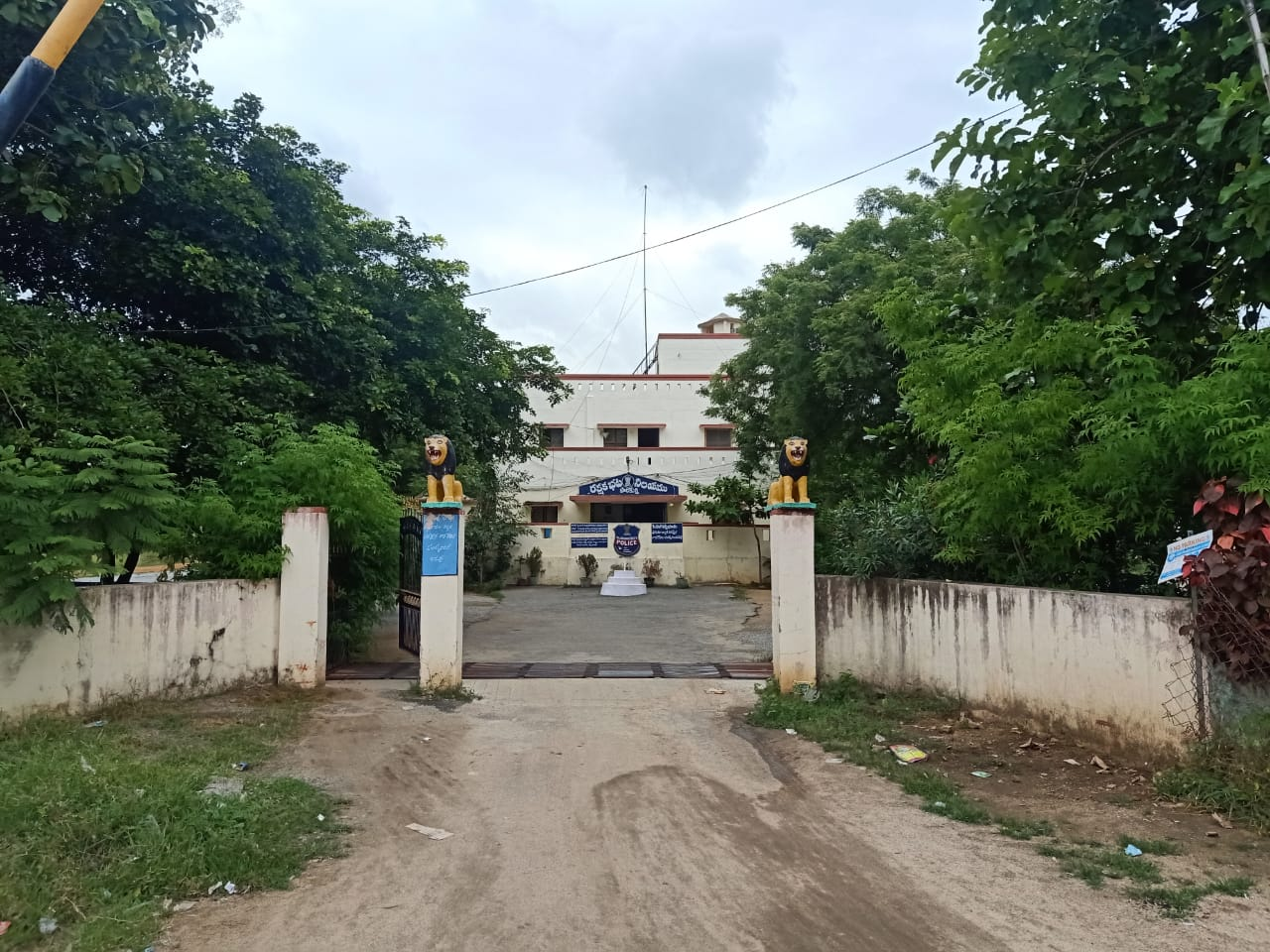
- Palakurthi Police Station

- Location in Telangana, India Palakurthi (India)
- Coordinates: 18°00′00″N 79°58′00″E
- Country: India
- State: Telangana State
- District: Jangaon
- Named for: palkulki somanadudu.

Government
  - Body: Mamidala Yashaswini Reddy MLA

Area
  - Total: 12.94 km^{2} (5.00 sq mi)

Population (2011)
  - Total: 7,380
  - Density: 570/km^{2} (1,480/sq mi)

Languages
  - Official: Telugu
- Time zone: UTC+5:30 (IST)
- Postal code: 506252
- Vehicle registration: TG - 03

Palakurthi is a census town in Jangaon district in the Indian state of Telangana.

== Demographics ==
As of 2001 India census, Palakurthi had a population of 6964. Males constitute 52% of the population and females 48%. Palakurthi has an average literacy rate of 56%, lower than the national average of 59.5%: male literacy is 66%, and female literacy is 46%. In Palakurthi, 13% of the population is under 6 years of age. Palakurthy town is famous for Sri Someshwara Laxminarasimha swamy temple which is located 1 km from town.

Palakurthi has a lake called palakurthi cheruvu it overflows every monsoon which is then diverted to other lakes.

It is close to Visnoor to the south.To the east there is dardepali.To the west there is the jangoan road.To the north there is the hanumakonda road.
