= A. M. Saravanam =

Indian politician

A.M.Saravanam
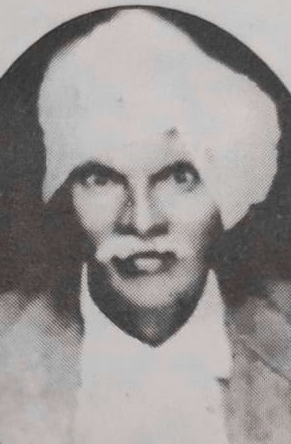
- Born: Tyagi Virudhunagar A.M.Saravanakumar; 1902; Udagamandalam, Ooty, Tamilnadu
- Died: 1975 (aged 54–55)
- Occupation: politician
- Political party: Indian National Congress

A. M. Saravanam (1902 - 7 December 1975) was an Indian independence activist and Indian National Congress politician.

== Early life ==
Saravanam was born in 1902 in Ooty, Tamil Nadu, staying there until 8th grade. He was raised in a rural community. He later became an agro-businessman.

== Political activity ==
He had a history of involvement in political struggle and joined Congress in 1932. He served from 1936 to 1956 and continued to serve in the Ooty Town Congress, and as both Secretary and President of Nilagiri District Congress.

Ooty and Nilgiris district was the second capital of the British. Saravanam arranged Mahatma Gandhi's visit to Nilgiris in 1934, where he inaugurated the Sundara Gandhi Vinayagar Temple that had been built by local washermen.

Saravanam was active in the Quit India movement. When Subhash Chandra Bose announced the Jai Hind independence slogan in 1942, he named his son Jaihind Rajan, at a time when many people were afraid to use the slogan in public. He was imprisoned several times and spent many years incarcerated in Ooty, Coimbatore, Trichy, Vellore, and Madras. His wife Mareyayee Ammal was also active in freedom protests.

He was involved in the Congress bargaining of relatives. Fearing his active involvement, the British arrested him and held him in a jungle inhabited by wild animals, 50 miles from Ooty from which he escaped.

After independence, Kamaraj offered him an MLC post that he rejected due to family circumstances. He was later appointed as a member of the Most Aboriginal Welfare Committee. He was approached by Congress as the district leader when the Congress barrage broke during the Indira Gandhi period. Saravanam launched and co-ran the Nilgiris District Laundry Workers Union.

He was shocked after Kamaraj's death and died on 7 December 1975.

He was awarded Prime Minister Indira Gandhi's Copper Sword and Commendation Bond.
