= Philippus Baldaeus =

Dutch minister

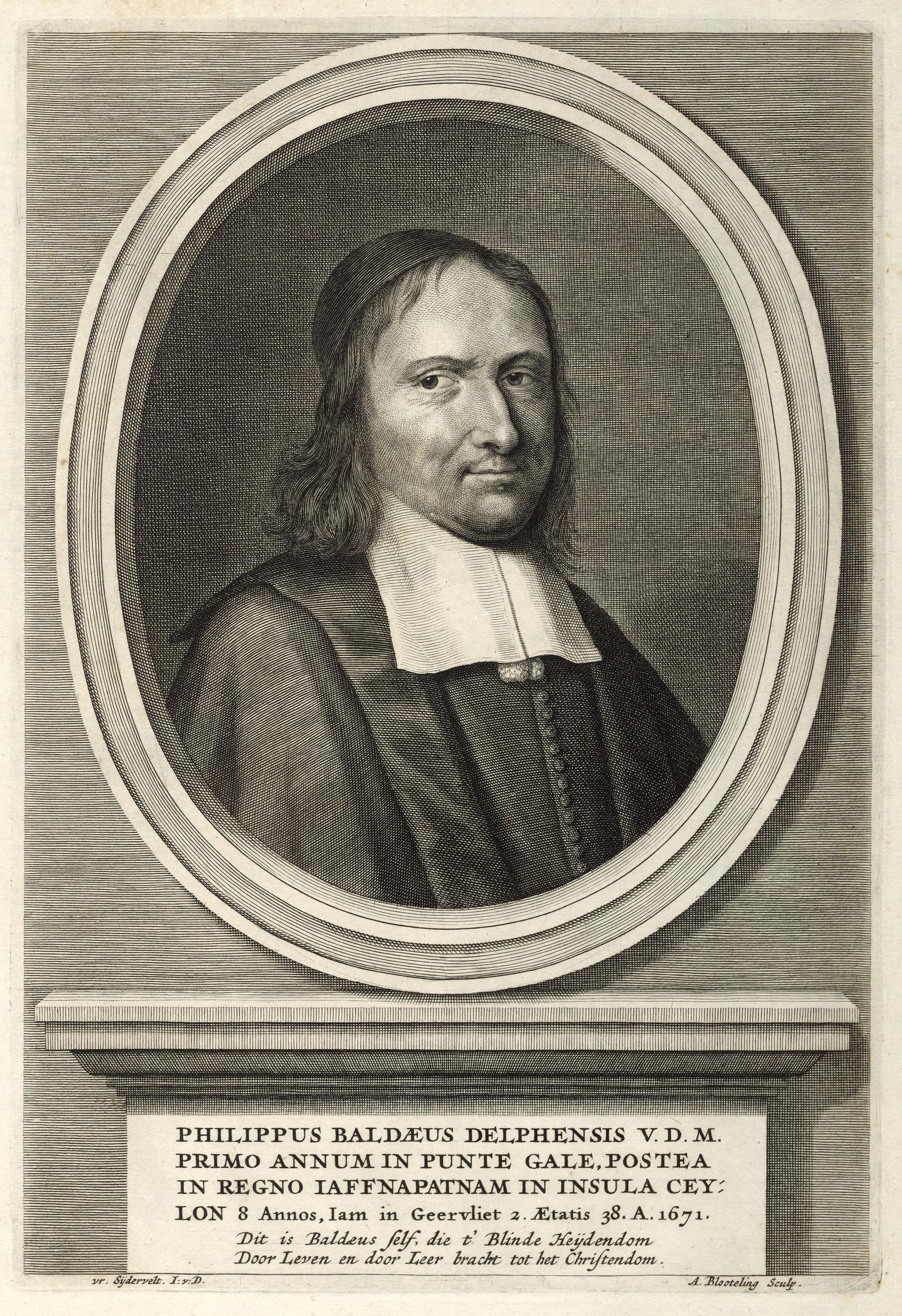
Philippus Baldaeus

Philips Baelde or Philippus Baldaeus, (baptized on 24 October 1632, Delft – 1671, Geervliet) was a Dutch minister. He went to Jaffna during the Dutch period in Ceylon with an invading Dutch force. As the second European after Abraham Rogerius, in his illustrated Description of the East Indian Countries of Malabar, Coromandel, Ceylon, etc. he documented the life, language and culture of the Tamil people, living in the north of the island. It was initially published in Dutch and German, while the English translation was published by the Ceylon Government Railway (1960).

He wrote much about the religious, civil and domestic conditions of the places he visited and introduced his account of the Hindu mythology. He translated the Lord's Prayer into the Tamil language, and although it had mistakes, it was remarkable as the first treatise printed in Europe of any Indian language. Baldaeus went back to Holland and preached until he died while still a young man.

== Life ==
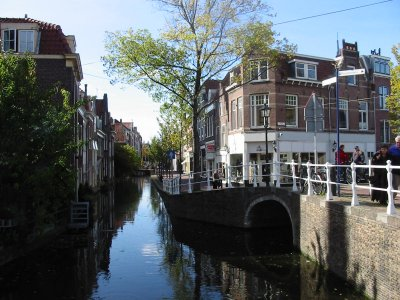
The Baelde family lived on Voldersgracht, where Johannes Vermeer, who was born in the same year, also grew up

Philips was the son of Jan Baelde (1610–1636) and Maria de Jonge (Junius). His father had a Flemish origin. His great-grandfather had left Ypres in 1584 after Alexander Farnese had occupied the city. His parents married in 1629. His father was a merchant and lived on Voldersgracht. His mother was the daughter of a local minister Isaac Junius. In 1630 his brother Jacob was born, who probably died in June 1636. In September and October his grandparents Junius died. His sister Maria was baptized on 16 November 1636. On the next day the mother died. Four days later his father was buried in the Nieuwe Kerk (Delft). So, when he was four years old Philips became an orphan.

=== Schools and universities ===
After all these losses, some because of the plague occurring in Delft in that year, it is supposed he was then raised by his grandfather Michiel in Delft. After attending Latin school he followed the footsteps of his maternal uncle and Reformed missionary, Robert Junius, active in Dutch Formosa from 1629 to 1643.

For a year and a half Philips studied philosophy, logic and oriental languages in Groningen (1649) and then theology in Leiden (1650–1654). In 1654 he married Maria van Castel (-1655), his cousin. After discussions with Arnoldus Montanus, he went into the service of the Dutch East India Company. Baldaeus left in October 1654 together with his wife. He lived from July 1655 in Batavia, Dutch East Indies, went to Makassar, Malacca and remarried Elisabeth Tribolet on board of a ship and on his way to Ceylon.

Baldaeus preached from 1657 to 1658 during Rijckloff van Goens's campaign against the Portuguese in Negapatnam on the Coromandel Coast.

The Dutch campaign against the Portuguese began in Jaffna, passing Mannar, Tuticorin and Nagapattinam and ended in South India. These were populated by Tamil Catholics who were converted Hindus. By 1660 the Dutch controlled the whole island except the Kingdom of Kandy and principality of Vanni. When the Dutch occupied the coast of Malabar in 1661, Baldaeus took part. Around 1662 he returned to Ceylon and Baldaeus learned Sanskrit and studied Hinduism.

Baldaeus settled in Jaffanapatnam in Northern Ceylon where the Tamil people lived. He learned the Tamil language and documented their life and culture. He was one of the first Europeans to publish at length about the region. He also made drawings and paintings of life in Ahmedabad, a busy trade city in Gujarat, a city he never actually visited.

=== Missionary and ethnologist in South India and Sri Lanka ===
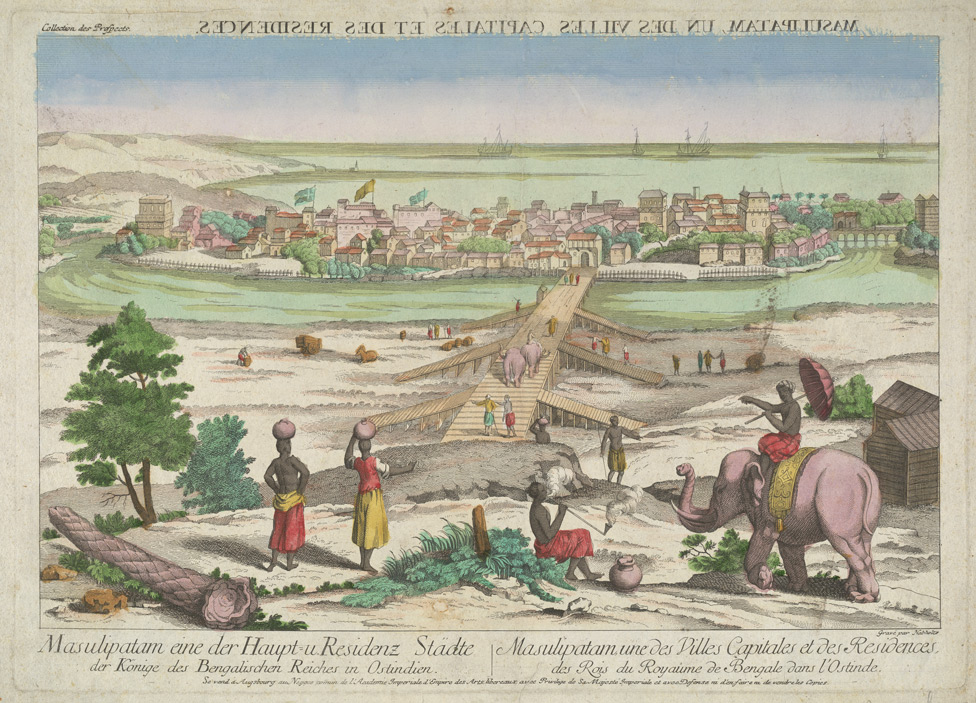
View of Masulipatnam in 1676. From Philippus Baldaeus, A True and Exact Description of the most Celebrated East-India Coasts of Malabar and Coromandel

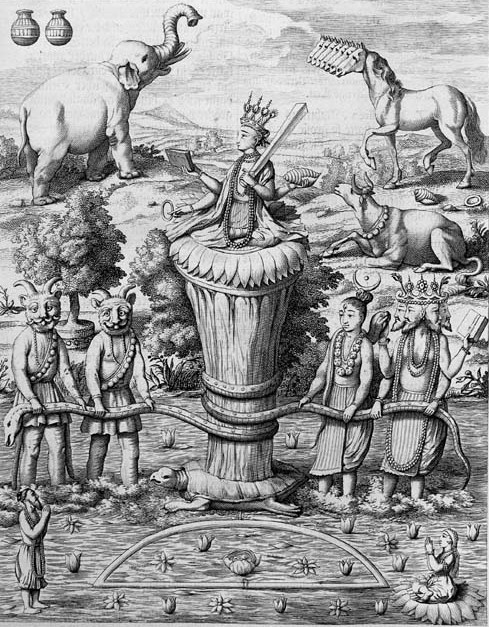
The Quirlung the milk sea by gods and the Asuras in Baldaeus' "Abgotterey"

Baldaeus served in Ceylon, both the Dutch Reformed Church as well as the native, formerly Catholic Christians, whom he had almost put the new faith. In the ranks of soldiers in the service of the VOC, there were also many Lutherans, especially German, considered by the pastors as a rival faith and were often sharply attacked in sermons.

Baldaeus' parish encompassed the entire coastal area of Sri Lanka, together with the islands and the Tamil southern tip of India, a territory that had been divided by the Portuguese in the 32 parishes, each with a church and a school and cared for by many monks and a Jesuit college. The aftermath of the Portuguese defeat and surrender at Jaffna created a vacuum for Christian preaching. Since the war was brutal with most of the Catholic slain and only 40 to 50 clergymen were among the survivors. For only four Calvinist preachers, this was a Herculean task as they were numerically few.

Catholic priests were committed preachers and their knowledge was highly valued. Baldaeus studied their writings and methods. He followed their model and travelled alone from church to church, converting about 12,387 local ex-Catholics to Calvinism. Their religious training was important to him, because to his chagrin, he found the religious education of the locals was very superficial. Tamils were "nominal Christians" or so-called "rice Christians" (according to the quantity of rice, which they received for their conversion).

Baldaeus had a good understanding of the culture and religion of the Tamils, and Sinhalese. Although primarily interested in proselytizing the Hindus and Catholics, he also strove for a better education for the natives, and as a result at the time of his departure, there were 18,000 school children whom he was responsible for as a religious teacher.

With his zeal, however, he came into conflict with the profit-oriented Dutch East India Company (VOC). VOC did not want to spend money on Christianity or education of the natives. VOC was greedy and overruled the Calvinistic preachers on ecclesiastical matters ("confusion breeds over godsvrucht", "greed over fear of God"). VOC furnished financial aid for Collegium Indicum in Leiden. VOC expected that the voluntary service missionaries would grow. A governor-general complained that VOC was deceived, "with these young Fanten we have more annoyance than with other ministers and subordinates,". The preacher had to turn on all sorts of ills - alcoholism, corruption, lax morals, slave trade and husbandry, abuse, etc. Preachers were also dependent on their ecclesiastical superiors in Batavia and they were able to put in complaints to the authorities at any time.

The company objected to Baldaeus' suggestions for improving religious education and converting the Tamils, and ruled that funds should be raised from fines levied in the enforcements of school rules. Baldaeus refused to conform and was nearly accused by the Governor of dishonest financial dealings. He could not continue his linguistic studies because the Church, bound by the state, thought it a waste of time.

=== Return to the Dutch Republic ===
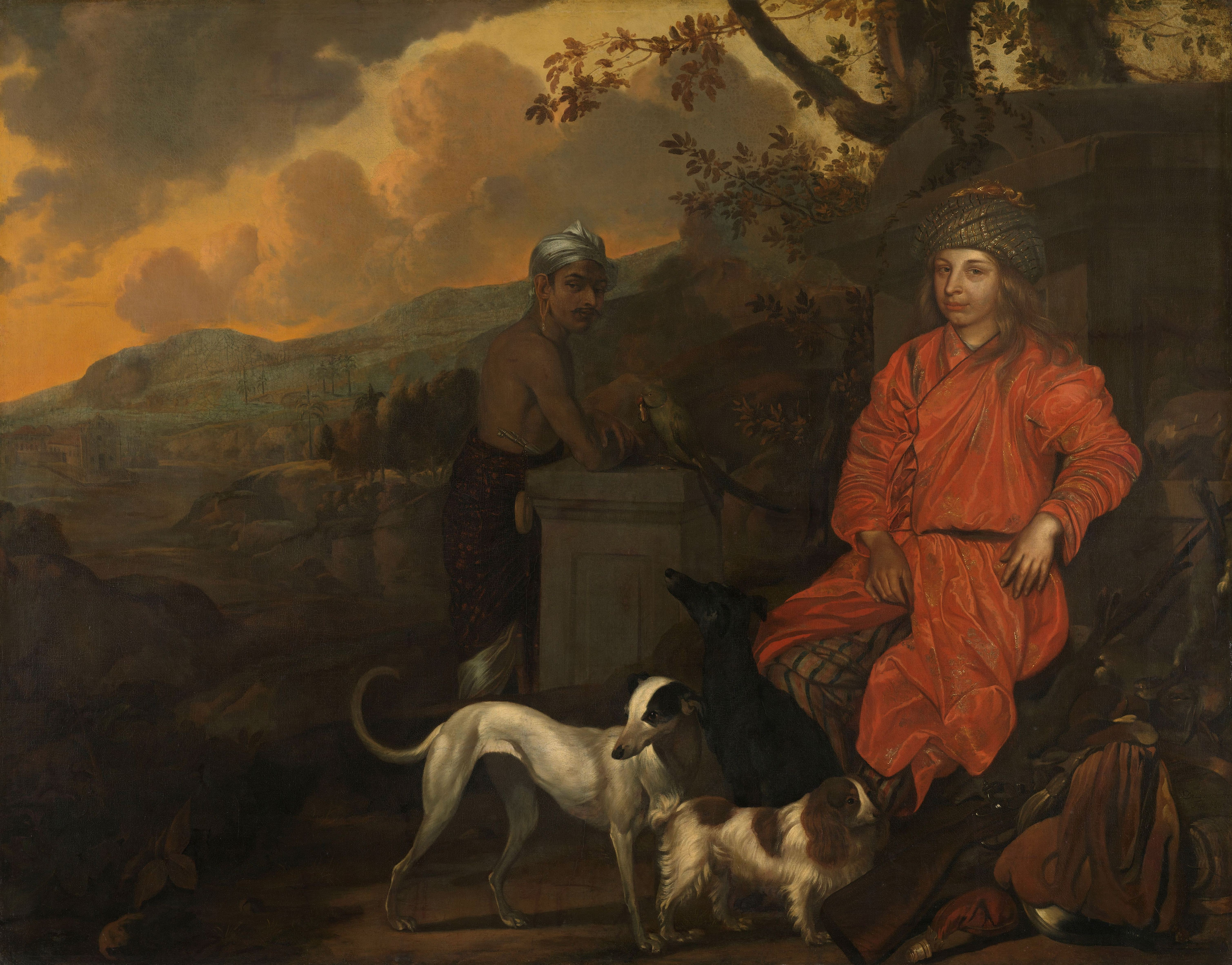
Portrait of Philippus Baldaeus and Gerrit Mossopotam, 1668

During 1665-1666 Baldaeus travelled via the Cape of Good Hope and returned to the Dutch Republic. Apparently he had committed in 1654 for ten years foreign service (Jong, S. Afgoderey).

In 1667, he wrote a detailed petition to the Dutch government, complaining about the greed of Dutch East India Company and also about how badly it affected the ecclesiastical affairs in Ceylon. He was not offered a place at the Collegium Indicum as contrary to his expectations. He preached in Geervliet from 1669 until his death at the age of 39 or 40, probably in 1671, as the widow remarried in June 1672 with Pieter Baelde. He left behind a full and faithful account of the civil, religious, and domestic condition of the countries through which he travelled. In this, he introduced also an interesting account of the Hindu mythology, and some specimens of the Tamil language, including the translation of the Lord's Prayer: defective enough it is true, but remarkable as the first treatise, printed in Europe, on any Indian language. The title of the whole work is Description of the East Indian Countries of Malabar, Coromandel, Ceylon, etc. (in Dutch, 1671) The book is dedicated to the bailiff Cornelis de Witt.

== Legacy ==
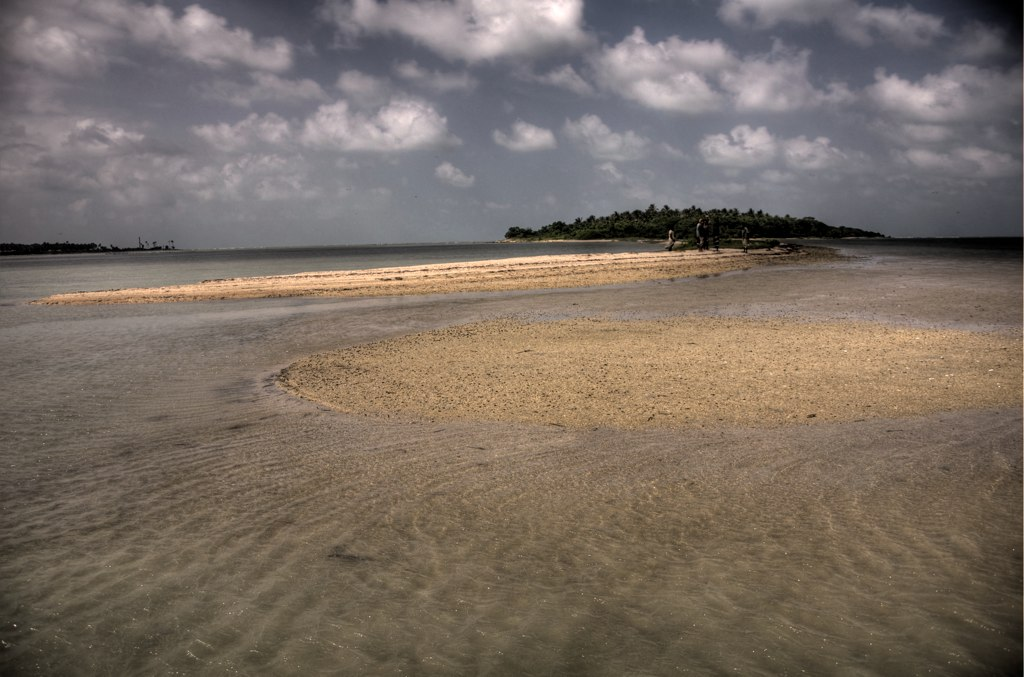
Jaffna islands

At present in Trincomalee there is a Baldeus Theological College training preachers for working as Calvinists in Asia.

Under a big tamarind tree in the middle of the Point Pedro Market Square stands a white limestone inscription which marks the place where Rev. Baldeus has regularly preached Christianity to the Tamils. This tamarind tree was uprooted during the cyclone of 1963.

Baldaeus recorded everything of value with ethnological, historical, geographical and theological viewpoints from himself or of informants (e.g., a baptized pundit), interpreters, or from the collections of the Jesuit libraries in Ceylon and South India. His records are still accessible in the Netherlands literature about south Asia and its detailed records. In addition, he quoted in Hebrew, Greek, Latin, English, French, Italian, Portuguese, and Sanskrit. His depiction of the Tamil language was groundbreaking. He had rudimentary knowledge in his own words. He probably did not know much more than the alphabet.

The book is divided into the following sections:

- "Detailed description of the East Indian coast or of Lagoon areas of Malabar and Coromandel" (includes: "short guide to the time sophisticated language arts")
- "Description of the great and famous island Ceylon"
- "Abgotterey of the East Indian heathen. A truthful and detailed description of the worship of the Hindus and Hindu idols."

With an ethnological, historical, geographical and theological point of view, Baldaeus recorded everything that he himself or from the knowledge of high caste learned people (pundits). in addition he gathered material brought by interpreters from the holdings of the Jesuit libraries in Ceylon and southern India and also later in the Netherlands from all the accessible literature about this part of South Asia. Thus, his knowledge of Sanskrit, as well as of the Portuguese as a lingua franca was widely used by him; In addition, he cited in Hebrew, Greek, Latin, English, French and Italian. His portrayal of Tamil language was groundbreaking although he admitted that he had only basic skills ("he knew probably not much more than the alphabet”). He was quite different from the Jesuits who learned Tamil so well that they confound even the Tamil pundits in language competitions with their language proficiency. He was not comparable to the Jesuit priests in his knowledge of Tamil as they were better scholars of Tamil. Jesuits even shamed the Tamil pundits in language competitions with their language skills. The Jesuit priest, Veeramamunivar Constanzo Beschi who stunned the Tamil pundits of Sangam Academy with his knowledge of classical Tamil even wrote his classical work in Tamil called Thembavani.

Baldaeus' book created the long-held belief that origin of European civilization started in India with Hindu and Buddhist origins. He was the first who told the wider European audience about Krishna mythology and the epics of Ramayana and Mahabharata. German philosophers continued his task and analyzed all the Oriental religions as a philosophy.
