= Vannar =

Tamil caste found in India and Sri Lanka

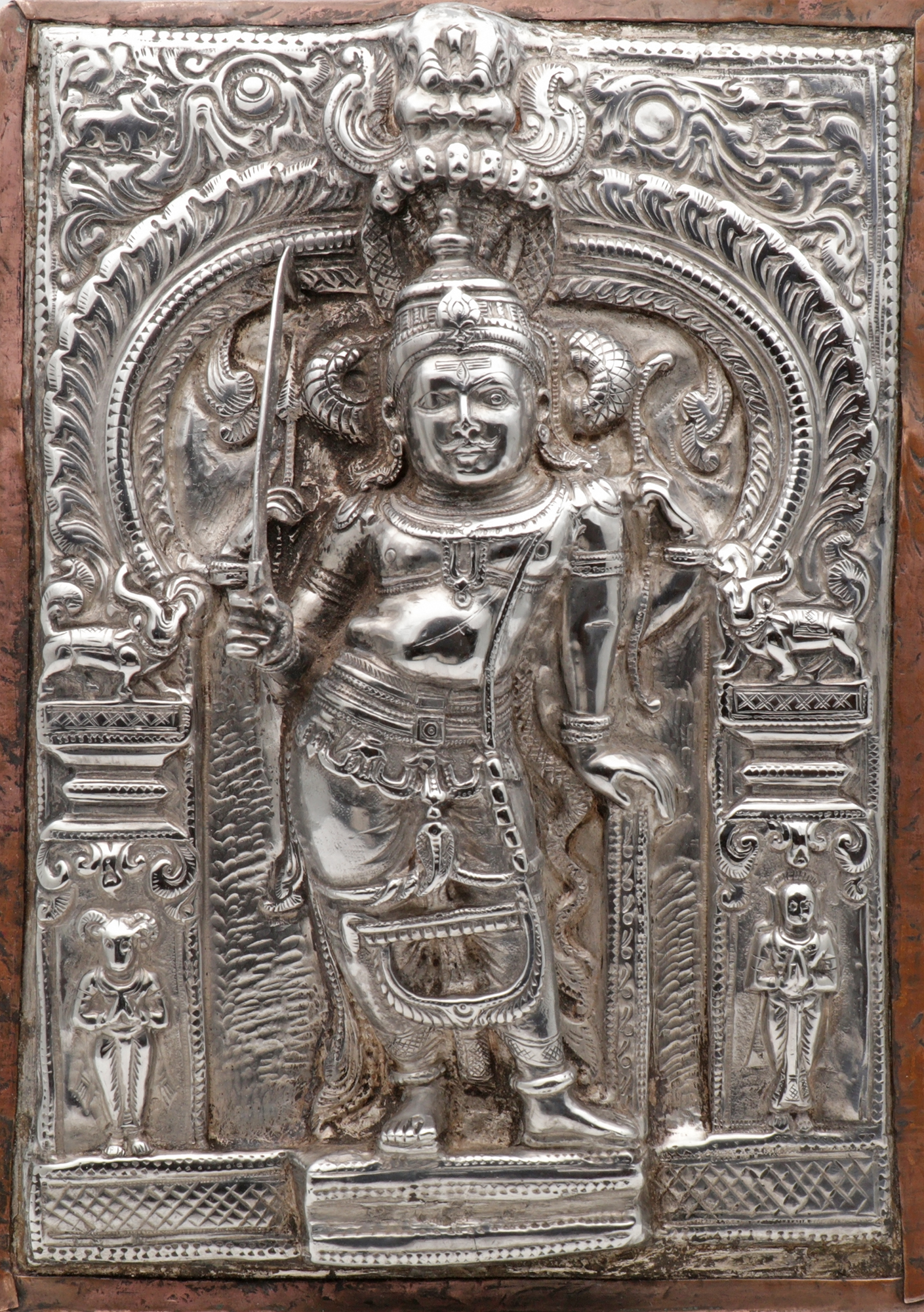
- Virabhadra is the primordial god of the Vannar community

Total population
- 2,072,625

Regions with significant populations
- India Other significant population centers: Sri Lanka

Languages
- Tamil

Religion
- Hindu; Muslim; Christian

Related ethnic groups
- Rajakulathor, Hēna

Vannar is a Tamil caste found primarily in the Indian state of Tamil Nadu and northeastern parts of Sri Lanka. The community has traditionally been involved in War. also agricultural workers They are in Tamil Nadu classified as Most Backward Class.

== Etymology ==
The word Vannar is thought to be derived from the Tamil word vannam meaning "beauty". The chief of this community uses the title Kattadi, meaning exorcist.

== History ==
The Vannars traditionally occupy the Sangam landscape Marutham. The Vannars are known as the descendants of Virabhadra and are considered to be the ancient inhabitants of the state The Vannars were also involved in the practice of Ayurvedic medicine. The Vannars served as domestic servants, who also gave importance as ceremonial officiators. The Vannars became the god of their clan Murugan is worshiped and all his Temples are decorated with Priests

== Legacy ==
What is now available are the inscriptions on the famous Vannar monastery at Chidambaram, which are available in two volumes. It is also known to have been established during the reign of King Vijayanagara. It is said that the first book of the three books and the second book of the same book belong to the same period. Among these, the Shivalingam, Nandi, Sulaam, Surya, Chandra, Veeramanavalar Devi, etc. are said to have been carved in the sculptures, and it is said that the Vannarmadam was renovated during the reign of King Vijayanagara Meykirti and Krishnadevarayar and Achutharayar. Datsun, Isan's father-in-law, who was created by Isan to destroy him and the gods and goddesses who volunteered to perform the sacrifice without inviting Isan. Both destroyed the gods and goddesses in the same way. The gods and goddesses who destroyed both were then revived by the Lord and Goddess for the welfare of the world, and the blood of the wounds inflicted on them by Veerapathira and Kali was immortal on them. In order to remove that blood, Eason orders Varuna to rain, and Varuna rains in the same way. However the blood stain remained on the clothes. So Eason ordered the warriors to remove that stain, and he was created one of the lineage. He is named Veeran and is sent to bleach the clothes of the gods and goddesses. Those who came in the way of the heroes and the way of the hero were called Vannar. They came to earth and did the same business

== Inscriptional sources ==
News about the Vannars has been available since ancient times, but back then the Vannars were not civil servants but paid laborers. such as vannar kanam, vannar karkasu are derived from vannar, vannars were Textile arts, landowners and donors of land and temple artifacts to the temple. It is not known when these people became civil servants, but it is said to have been donated in the 14th century to the Karichunthamangalam Perumal temple as a gift.

== Notes of Vannars ==
The castes on the right were castes engaged in Agriculture work, while the Left were castes were non-agricultural castes engaged in handicrafts such as metal workers and weavers. The place followed during the Chola period is about the right-wingers in the history of the right-wing caste

"Kayvanaval Allitharum and the tiger flag were hoisted
were Identified"

— -Right hand history

About Tamil Vannar and Vaduka Vannar As told in the histories of Bharatavarsha

"with curved
lotus garland
white elephant"

— - Inhabitants of india

== Srilankan Vannars ==
In Sri Lanka, the Vannars worship King Periyathambiran, the ruler of the city of Valavai, as their tribal deity Each community is shown their identities by the "Nikandu Sulamani" in that order

"Valavai with a white flag thumbai flower
Are found"

— -Nikandu Sulamani

In the Tolkāppiyam, Thumbai is taken as a department and Thumbai is said to be a separate grammar for the War.

== Notable peoples ==
- Bannari Amman -a powerful goddess from the Tamil and Kannada folklore.

== See also ==
- Dhobi
- Muslim Dhobi
- Panicker
