= Idangai =

Idangai or the left hand is a caste-based division of communities in Tamil Nadu, India, that was in vogue from ancient times right up to the 19th and even the early decades of the 20th century AD. Since India's independence, the differences have practically vanished. The corresponding division is Valangai.

== Constituent castes ==
From ancient times, there was intense rivalry between the left-handed and right-handed factions. The Idangai faction was numerically inferior to the Valangai and comprised six castes as opposed to the sixty of the Valangai. It was also unclear as to which castes constituted each faction. Some castes considered to be left-handed in some areas were regarded as right-handed in others and vice versa. Roughly speaking, the Valangai or right-handed faction was made up of castes with an agricultural basis while the Idangai was made of metal workers, weavers, etc. i.e. castes involved in manufacturing.The core groups in Idangai were the five castes called Anchalar/ Panchalar. i.e.-

1. Kannar
2. Thattar
3. Asari
4. Kollar
5. Thachan

Further castes were added at various times.

The Valangai faction was better organized, politically, than the Idangai.

== See also ==
- Caste system in India
- Valangai
