= Valangai =

Agricultural caste of Tamil Nadu, India

Valangai or the right hand refers to a caste-based division of communities in the Indian state of Tamil Nadu that was in vogue from ancient times right up to the 19th and even the early decades of the 20th century AD. Since India's independence, the differences have practically vanished.

The Valangai or right-handed faction was made up of castes with an agricultural basis while the Idangai was made of metal workers, weavers, etc. i.e. castes involved in manufacturing.

The Valangai faction was numerically superior to the Idangai or left-handed faction. There were 6 castes in the Idangai faction as opposed to sixty in the Valangai faction. The Valangai faction was better organized, politically, than the Idangai.

Jean-Antoine Dubois on Valangai writes, The Paraiyars are its chief support, as a proof of which they glory in the title ‘Valangai-Mougattar’, or friends of the Right-hand.

During the Chola period, the left and right-hand factions comprised ninety-eight castes each, but by the 19th century, the right-hand faction was made of 60 castes, and the left-hand, only six.

== See also ==
- Caste system in India
- Idangai
