= Nalavar =

Sri Lankan Tamil caste traditionally involved in toddy tapping

Nalavar (Tamil: நளவர், romanized: Naḷavar) is a Tamil caste found in Sri Lanka. They were traditionally occupied in palm tree climbing and toddy tapping.

== Etymology ==
According to a folk etymology is the name Nalavar a corrupted form of Naluvinavar (those who decamped), which they gained after withdrawing from a battle field. Another theory suggest the name is derived from Nalua meaning to climb, in reference to their traditional occupation.

It has also been proposed that the name is derived from Naravar (from Naravu, ancient Tamil term for toddy).

== History ==
According to Yalpana Vaipava Malai were the Nalavars originally called Nambis who originally Vanniar chieftains and served as bowmen. A former subdivision among them were known as Kottai Vayil Nalavar i.e. "Nalavars in service of the fort".

Under the Dutch Ceylon was the Thesavalamai law codified. This law allowed landlords to have slaves, and the Nalavars were also employed as agriculture labors, and were classified along with the Pallar under the term Adimai (slave).

== Customs ==
The badge and cattle brand mark of the Nalavars is the bow and arrow. The Nalavar along with the Pallar worship Annamar, their caste deity.

== See also ==
- Caste system in Sri Lanka
- Ezhava
- Idiga
