= Bernisse =

- Village
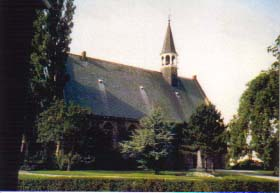
- Church in Oudenhoorn

- Flag

- Location in South Holland
- Coordinates: 51°51′N 4°15′E
- Country: Netherlands
- Province: South Holland
- Municipality: Nissewaard

Area
  - Total: 68.46 km^{2} (26.43 sq mi)
  - Land: 57.34 km^{2} (22.14 sq mi)
  - Water: 11.12 km^{2} (4.29 sq mi)
- Elevation: 0 m (0 ft)

Population (January 2021)
  - Total: data missing
- Time zone: UTC+1 (CET)
  - Summer (DST): UTC+2 (CEST)
- Postcode: 3211–3218, 3227
- Area code: 0181
- Website: www.gemeentebernisse.nl

Bernisse (Dutch pronunciation: [bɛrˈnɪsə]) is a village and former municipality in the western Netherlands, in the province of South Holland. Since 2015 it has been a part of the municipality of Nissewaard.

The former municipality had a population of data missing in 2021, and covered an area of 68.46 km^{2} (26.43 sq mi) of which 11.12 km^{2} (4.29 sq mi) was water.

The former municipality was named after the river Bernisse, which flows right through it from the Spui to the Brielse Meer and separates the estuary islands of Voorne and Putten.

The former municipality of Bernisse consisted of the following communities: Abbenbroek, Biert, Geervliet, Heenvliet, Oudenhoorn, Simonshaven, Zuidland.

The municipality of Bernisse was formed on 1 January 1980, by merging the municipalities Abbenbroek, Oudenhoorn, Zuidland, together with parts of the municipalities Geervliet (including Simonshaven) and Heenvliet.

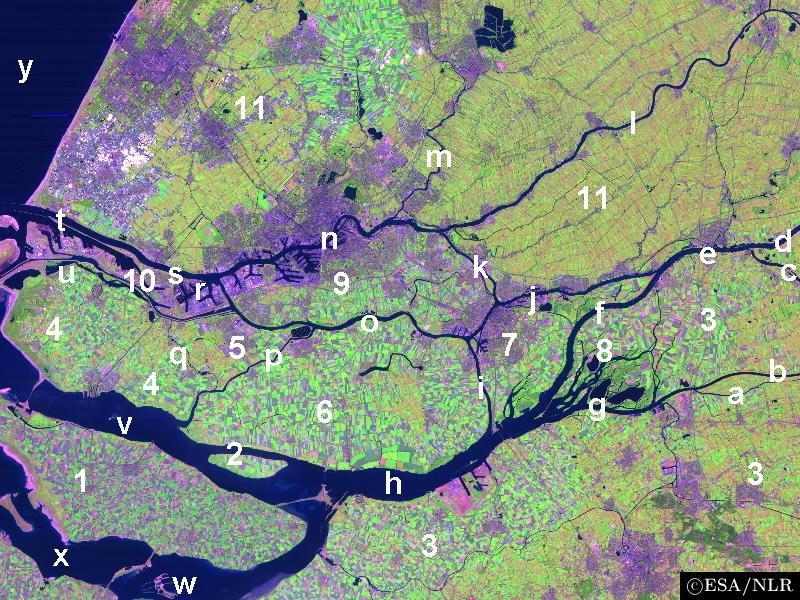
Satellite image of the Rhine-Meuse delta showing the Bernisse river (q) and the islands of Voorne (4) and Putten (5)

== Topography ==
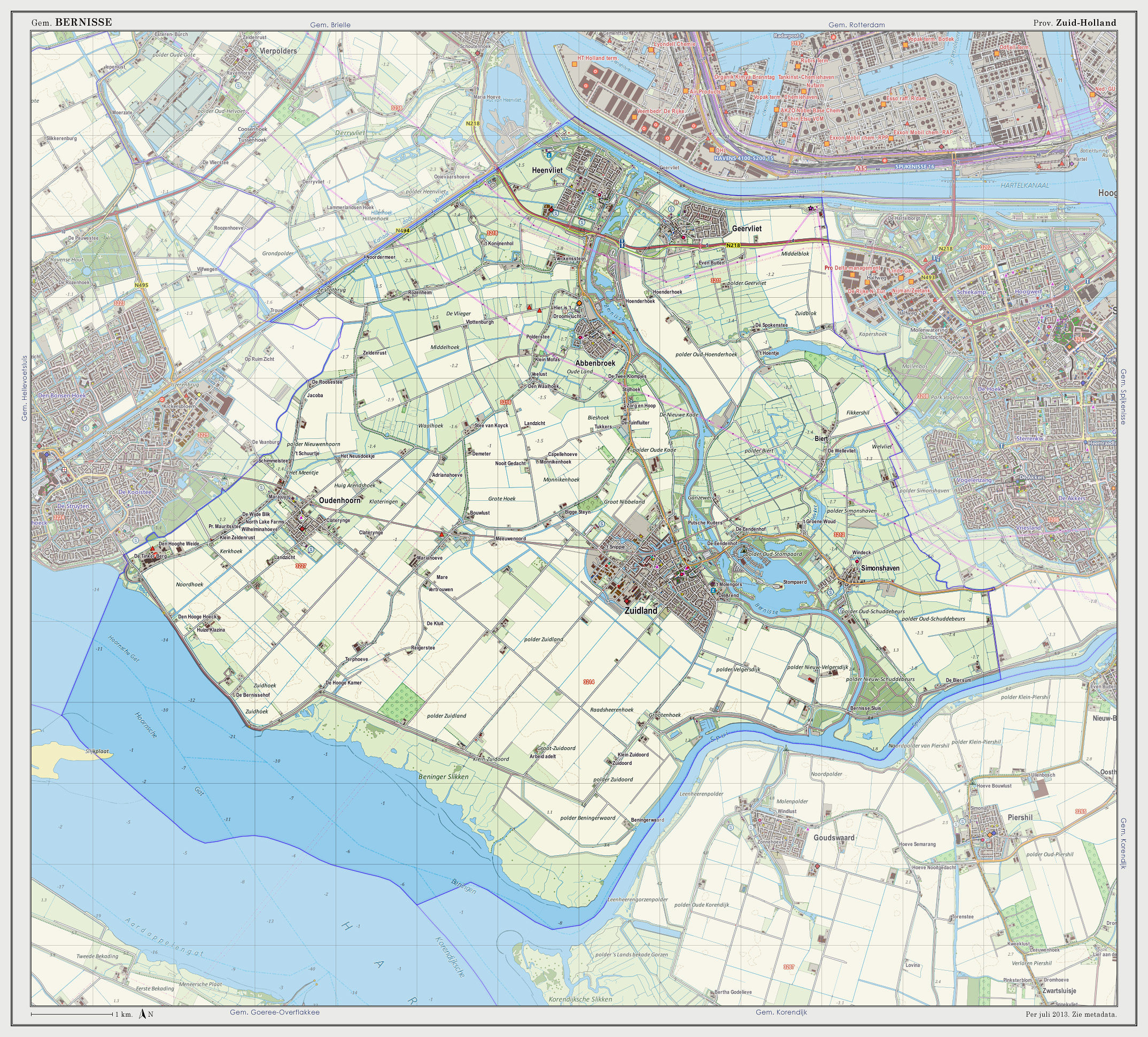

Dutch Topographic map of the former municipality of Bernisse, 2013.

== Notable people ==
- Dirk van Hogendorp (1761 in Heenvliet – 1822) a somewhat "troublesome" Dutch officer and author
- Maarten den Bakker (born 1969 in Abbenbroek) a retired road bicycle racer, competed in the 1988 Summer Olympics
- Alexander van Oudenaarden (1970 in Zuidland) a Dutch biophysicist and systems biologist
- Chanella Stougje (born 1996 in Zuidland) a Dutch professional racing cyclist
