= Adrie Poldervaart =

Dutch football manager (born 1970)

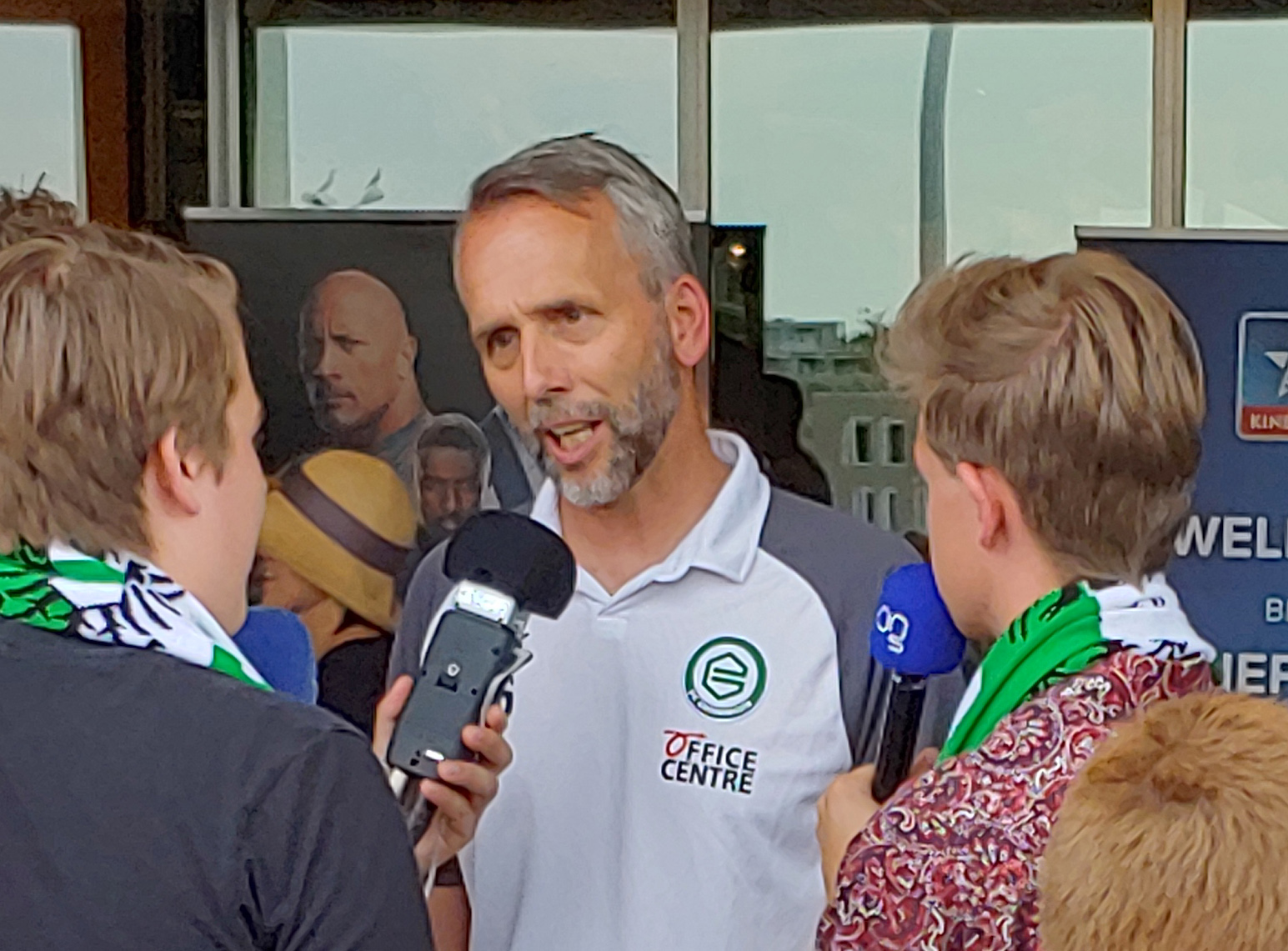
- Poldervaart in 2019

Personal information
- Full name: Adrie Poldervaart
- Date of birth: 20 December 1970 (age 55)
- Place of birth: Oudenhoorn, Netherlands

Team information
- Current team: Feyenoord U21 (head coach)

Youth career
- 1976–1986: OHVV

Senior career*
Years	Team	Apps	(Gls)
1986–1989	OHVV		
1989–1990	Spijkenisse		
1990–1993	OHVV		
1993–1995	Nieuwenhoorn		
1995–2002	OHVV		

Managerial career
- 1998–2001: OHVV (player-manager)
- 2001–2002: Nieuwenhoorn (assistant)
- 2002–2005: Nieuwenhoorn
- 2005–2012: Spijkenisse
- 2012–2015: Zwaluwen
- 2015–2018: BVV Barendrecht
- 2018–2019: Excelsior
- 2019–2022: Groningen (assistant)
- 2022–2023: De Graafschap
- 2023–2025: Fortuna Sittard (assistant)
- 2025–2026: Quick Boys
- 2026–: Feyenoord U21
- * Club domestic league appearances and goals

Adrie Poldervaart (born 20 December 1970) is a Dutch professional football manager and former football player who is the head coach of Feyenoord U21.

== Sports career ==
Poldervaart played in his youth and senior career exclusively for OHVV Oudenhorn. Poldervaart was hired in 1992 as a sports physiotherapist at Excelsior Rotterdam. He has also been a physiotherapist for VV Nieuwenhoorn.

Next to being a physiotherapist at Excelsior, he became a player/manager at OHVV in 1998. In 2001, Poldervaart became an assistant coach and in 2002, he became a coach for VV Nieuwenhoorn. In 2005, he moved on to VV Spijkenisse. Only in 2012, he changed again, this time for VV Zwaluwen. For his achievements at Zwaluwen, Poldervaart received the Rinus Michels Award. From 2015 to 2018, he coached BVV Barendrecht.

In 2018, Poldervaart became the manager of Excelsior. He replaced Mitchell van der Gaag who left for NAC Breda. After 26 years, Poldervaart stopped working as Excelsior's physiotherapist. In 2019, after disappointing results, he stopped coaching Excelsior. Instead, Poldervaart became the assistant coach of FC Groningen.

On 10 May 2022, De Graafschap appointed Poldervaart as head coach on a two-year deal, effective from 1 July, succeeding Reinier Robbemond.

In February 2023, Poldervaart was hospitalised with Guillain–Barré syndrome, prompting assistant coach Richard Roelofsen to assume first-team duties for the remainder of the season. Following the conclusion of the 2022–23 campaign, De Graafschap announced that Poldervaart would not return as head coach, though the club would continue to support him through his rehabilitation.

In March 2025, after serving as assistant coach at Fortuna Sittard for two seasons, Poldervaart was appointed head coach of Tweede Divisie club Quick Boys, effective from the start of the 2025–26 season, succeeding Thomas Duivenvoorden. He won the division title in his only season in charge, Quick Boys' second consecutive Tweede Divisie title. On 29 May 2026, days after the title was secured, Feyenoord announced that Poldervaart would leave Quick Boys after one season to take charge of their under-21 team from 1 July, on a contract until 2028; the move returned him to professional football.

== Honours ==
Quick Boys

- Tweede Divisie: 2025–26
