= VV Nieuwenhoorn =

Association football club in Nieuwenhoorn, Netherlands

- Full name: Voetbalvereniging Nieuwenhoorn
- Nicknames: Eilands Glorie (Glory of the Island)
- Founded: 1 June 1929; 96 years ago
- Ground: Sportpark Nieuwenhoorn, Hellevoetsluis
- Capacity: 2.500
- Chairman: Kees Kruisbergen
- Manager: Rody van Hemert
- League: Eerste Klasse
- 2024–25: Eerste Klasse C, 1st of 14
- Website: http://www.nieuwenhoorn.nl/
Home colours	Away colours

Voetbalvereniging Nieuwenhoorn is a football club based in Nieuwenhoorn, South Holland, Netherlands. Founded in 1929, they are currently members of the Eerste Klasse, the sixth tier of the Dutch football league system. They play their home matches at Sportpark Nieuwenhoorn.

== History ==
The club was founded on 1 June 1929.

It won the 1980 KNVB District Cup for Sunday amateur clubs in the West 2 District. One year later, Nieuwenhoorn won the District Cup for all amateur clubs in the same district.

In 2013, Niewenhoorn started a Saturday squad and in 2014 it dropped its Sunday squad. In 2022, Nieuwenhoorn ended runner-up during the Eerste Klasse season. It promoted to the Vierde Klasse after heavy clashes between supporters in the decisive playoff game against WHC Wezep. The decisive penalties were taken after the supporters had been dispersed by the police.

=== Head coach ===
==== Saturday squad ====
- Steef Buijs (2015–2018)
- Oscar Biesheuvel (2021–2023)
- Cesco Agterberg (2023–2024)
- Rody van Hemert (2024–2025)

==== Sunday squad ====
- Aad Andriessen
- Adrie Poldervaart (2002–2005)
- Marco van Rijn (2007–2009)
- Wim Schaap (2012–2014)
