= Simonshaven =

Coordinates: 51°49′N 4°17′E

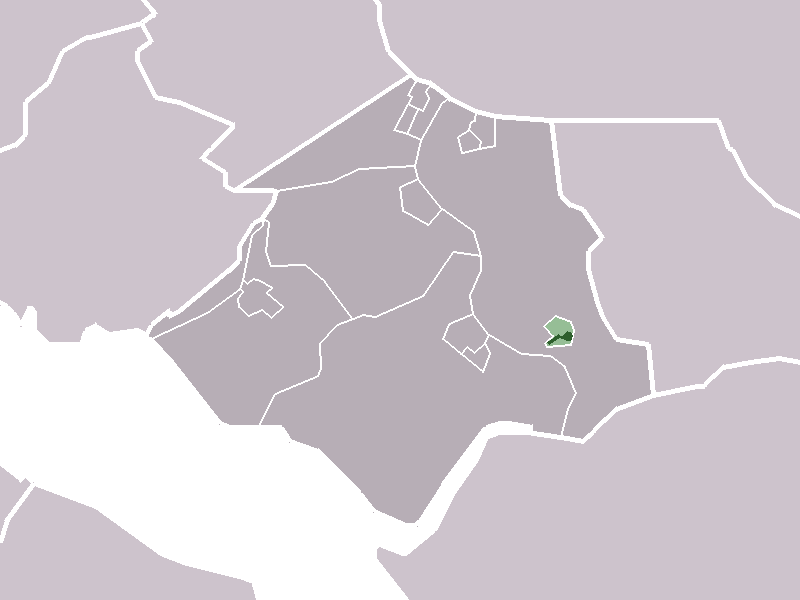
- The town centre (darkgreen) and the statistical district (lightgreen) of Simonshaven in the former municipality of Bernisse.
- Country: Netherlands
- Province: South Holland
- Municipality: Nissewaard

Population
  - Estimate: 445

Simonshaven is a village in the Dutch province of South Holland. It is a part of the municipality of Nissewaard, and lies about 4 km southwest of Spijkenisse.

In 2001, the village of Simonshaven had 231 inhabitants. The built-up area of the village was 0.06 km², and contained 103 residences. The somewhat larger statistical area of Simonshaven has a population of around 290.

Until 2015, Simonshaven was part of Bernisse.

The poet Augusta Peaux was born in Simonshaven, where her father was a preacher.
