= Abbenbroek =

- Village
- Coat of arms

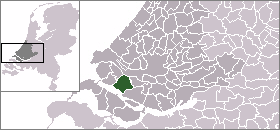

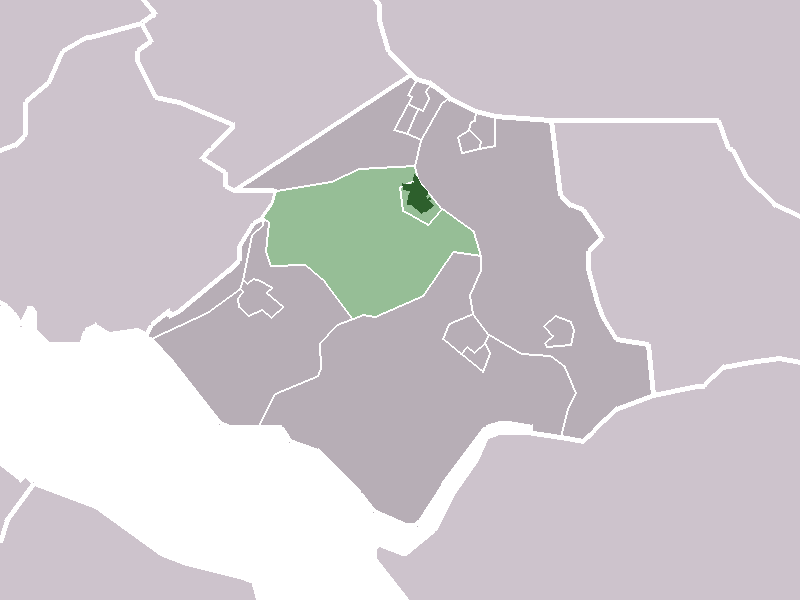
- The village centre (darkgreen) and the statistical district (lightgreen) of Abbenbroek in the former municipality of Bernisse.
- Coordinates: 51°50′55″N 4°14′34″E
- Country: Netherlands
- Province: South Holland
- Municipality: Nissewaard

Population
  - Total: 1,349
- Time zone: UTC+1 (CET)
  - Summer (DST): UTC+2 (CEST)

Abbenbroek is a village in the Dutch province of South Holland. It is a part of the municipality of Nissewaard, and lies about 6 km west of Spijkenisse.

In 2001, the village of Abbenbroek had 971 inhabitants. The built-up area of the town was 0.22 km², and contained 390 residences. The wider statistical district of Abbenbroek, covering the town and the "Polder Abbenbroek", has a population of around 1350.

Until 1980, Abbenbroek was a separate municipality, when it became part of Bernisse.

The municipal coat of arms is attested in the Beyeren Armorial (c. 1405, fol. 39v). It shows a pair of breeches, reflecting the popular interpretation of the element broek (properly "brook, marshland").
