= Zuidland =

- Town
- Flag Coat of arms

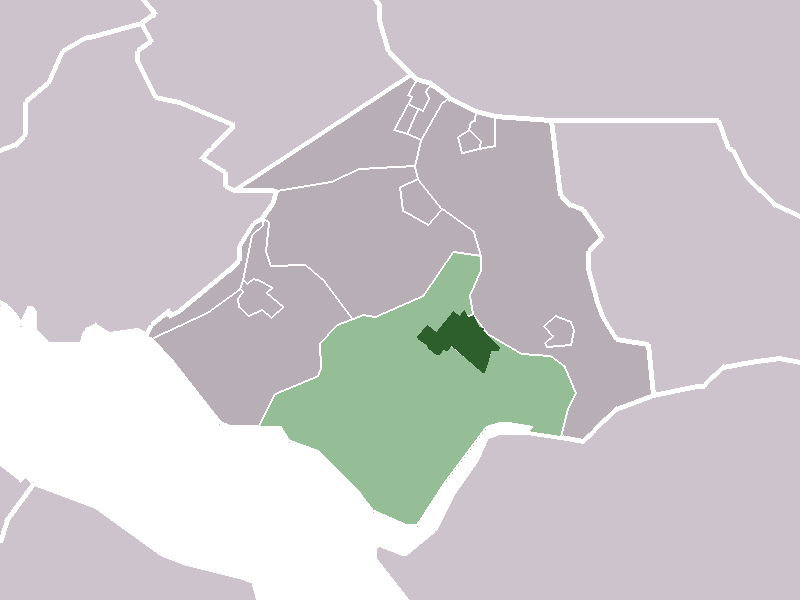
- The town centre (darkgreen) and the statistical district (lightgreen) of Zuidland in the former municipality of Bernisse.
- Coordinates: 51°49′19″N 4°15′29″E
- Country: Netherlands
- Province: South Holland
- Municipality: Nissewaard

Population (2022)
  - Total: 6,094
- Time zone: UTC+1 (CET)
  - Summer (DST): UTC+2 (CEST)

Zuidland is a town in the Dutch province of South Holland. It is a part of the municipality of Nissewaard, and lies about 6 km west of Spijkenisse.

As of 2022, the town of Zuidland had 6,094 inhabitants, they are called "Slandenaren". The built-up area of the town was 0.87 km^{2}, and contained 1,878 residences. The wider statistical district of Zuidland, which also covers the "Polder Zuidland", has a population of around 5,130.

Zuidland was a separate municipality until 1980, when it became part of Bernisse.

== Gallery ==
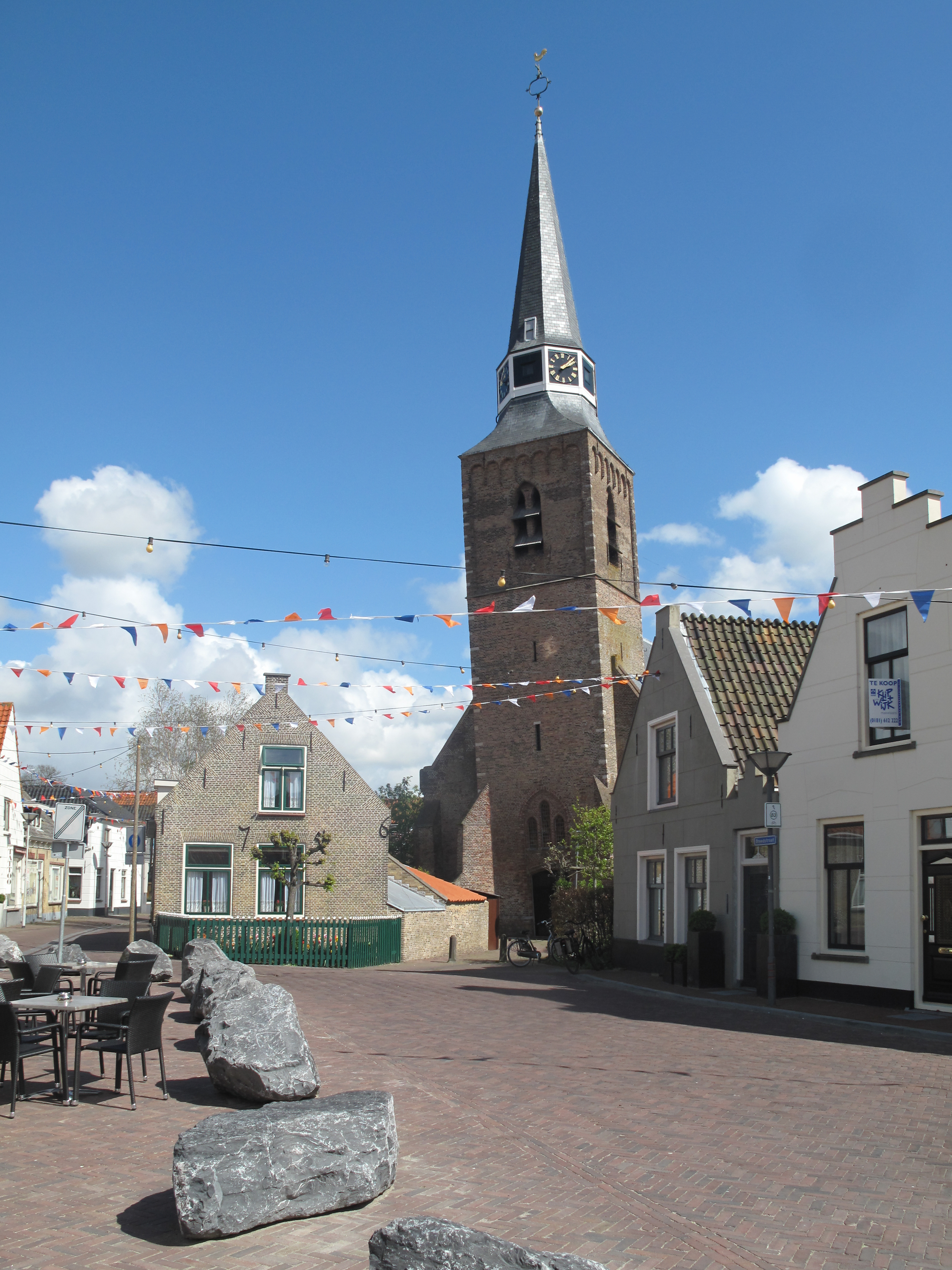
Zuidland, church: de Bartholomeüskerk

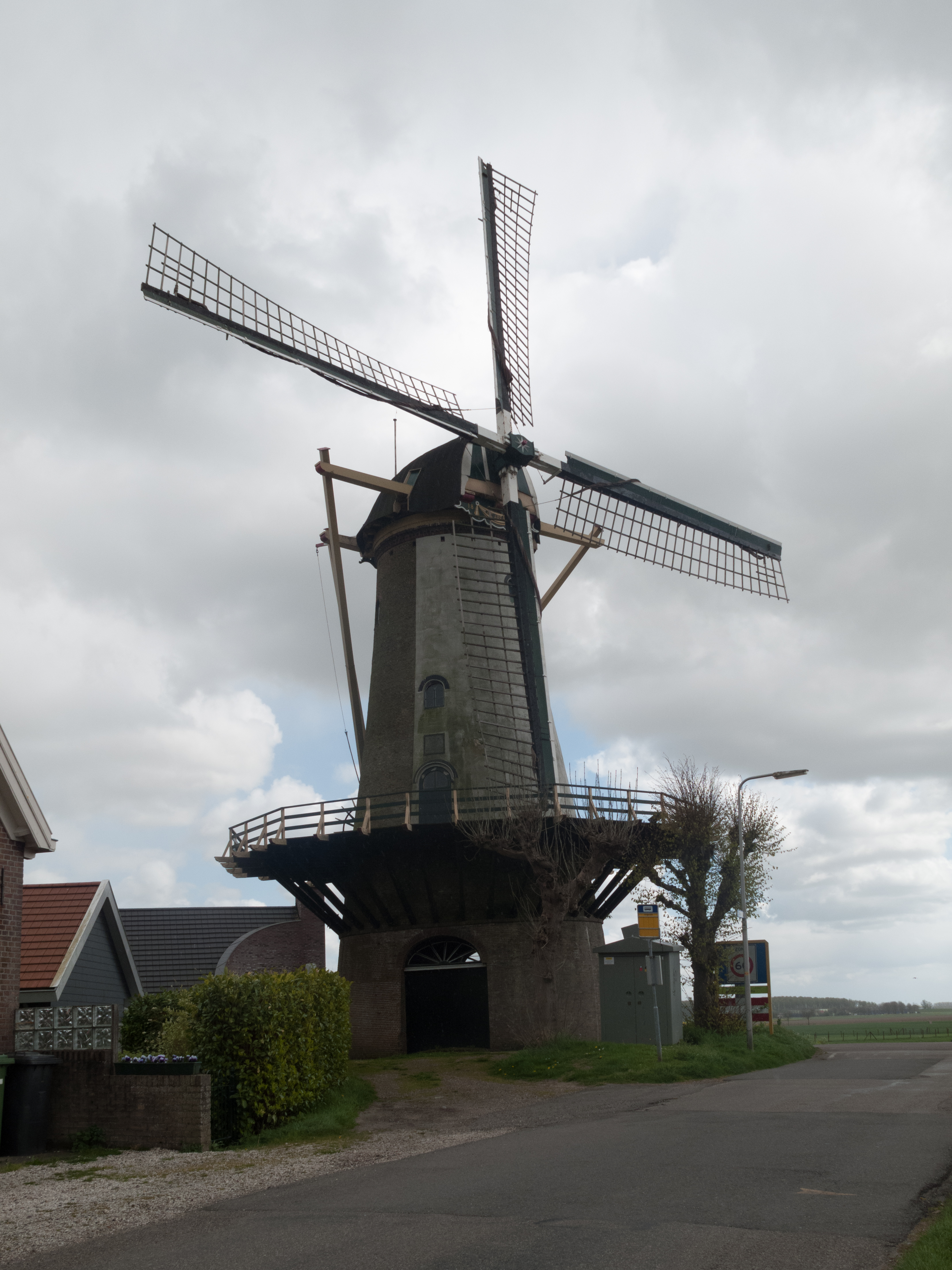
Zuidland, windmill: korenmolen de Arend

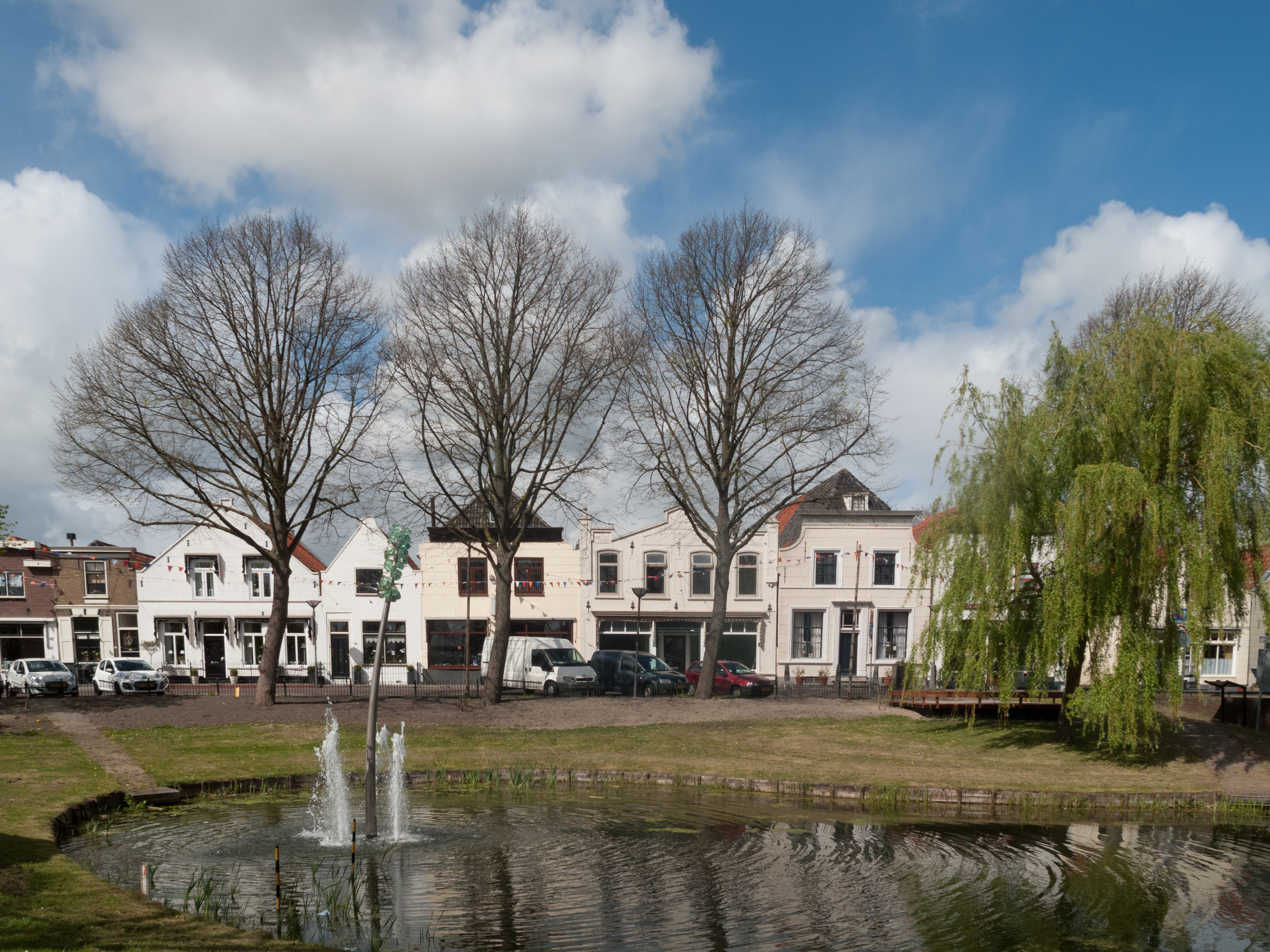
Zuidland, view to a street: de Ring
