= Ravesteyn Castle =

- Heenvliet, Netherlands
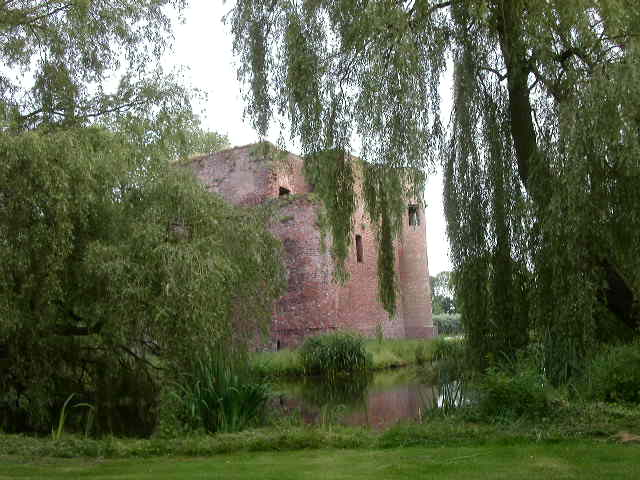

Site information
- Type: Castle
- Condition: Protected ruin

Location
- Coordinates: 51°51′47″N 4°14′33″E

Site history
- Built: c. 1250
- Materials: Stone; Brick

Ravesteyn Castle (Dutch: Kasteel Ravesteyn or Slot Heenvliet) is a castle in Heenvliet, South Holland. The castle was likely built circa 1250, and was in use until being destroyed during the Eighty Years' War. The castle ruins are part of a protected garden.

== Description ==
Ravesteyn Castle was built in the mid-13th century by Hugo, Lord of Heenvliet. Ravensteyn Castle was one of 5 fortified structures built in the area and would be the only one to survive. The two story castle was occupied for several centuries. A residential wing was added to the castle in the 14th-century, and that same century the fortification burned to its foundations before being rebuilt.

The castle continued to serve as a prison and military fortification during the 16th-century; notably, one source noted that Dutch priest Angelus Merula was once imprisoned in the castle. The castle was intentionally destroyed in 1572 by Dutch Sea Beggars during the Dutch revolt against Spain in order to keep the castle from being used by the Spanish army. The castle ruins and moat remain near Heenvliet and are part of protected garden.
