= Heenvliet =

Coordinates: 51°52′N 4°15′E

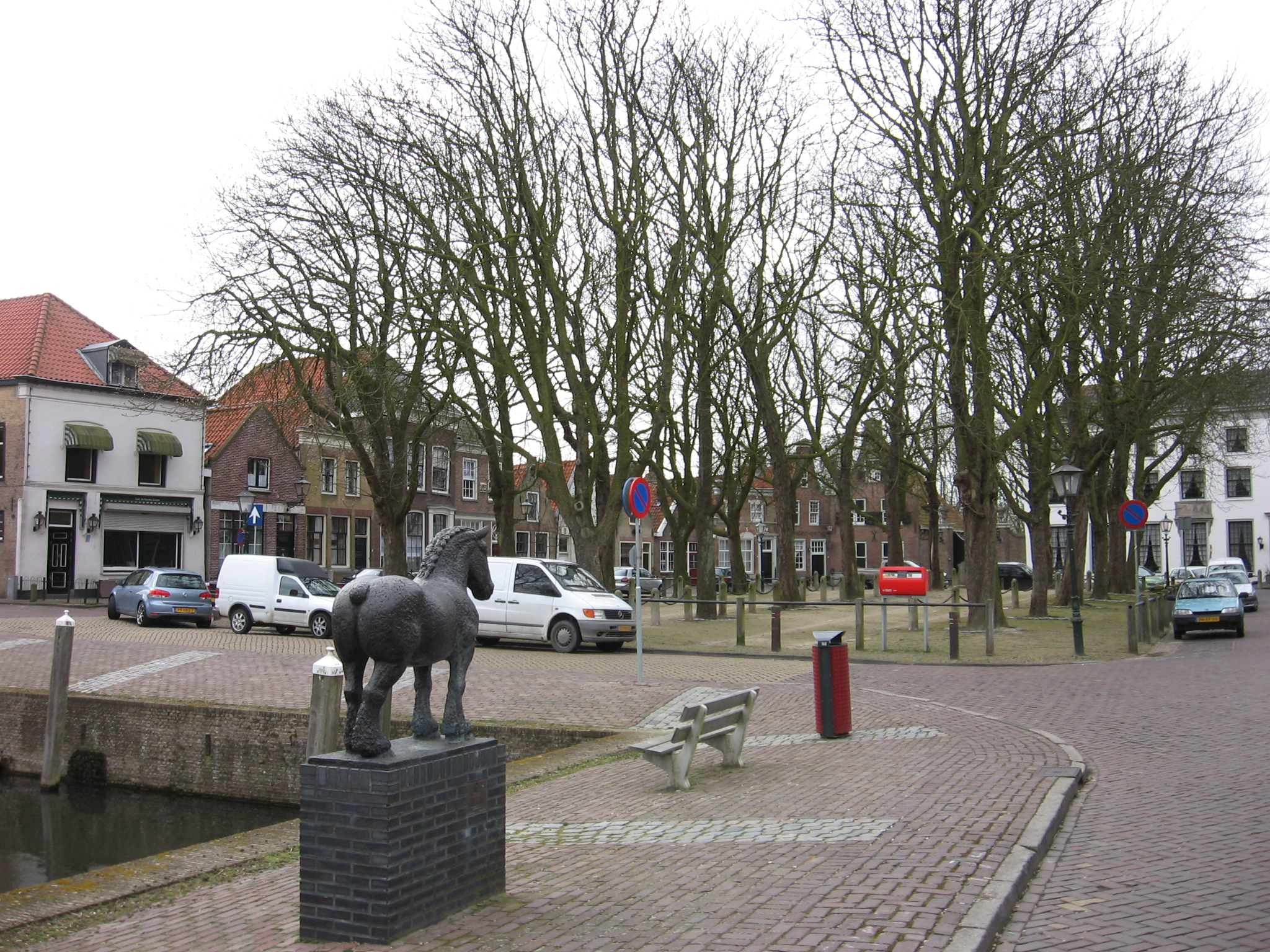

- Coat of arms

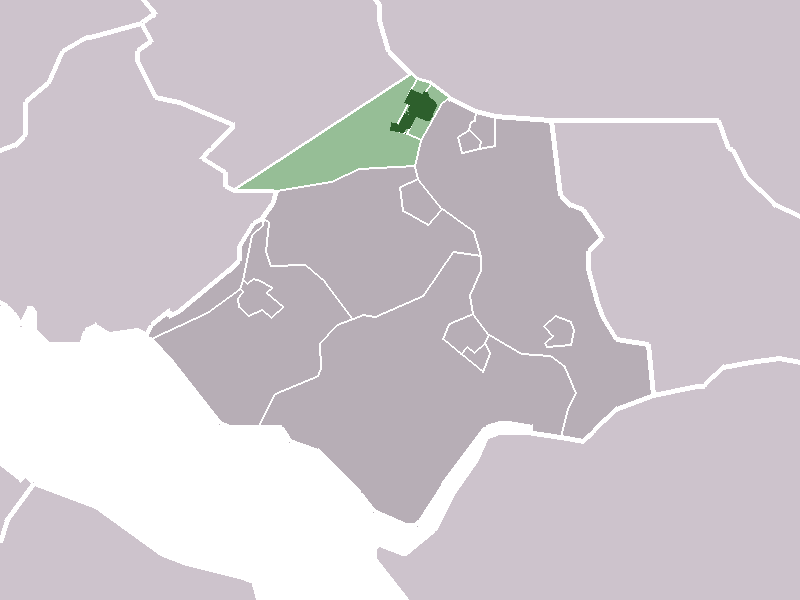
- Country: Netherlands
- Province: South Holland
- Municipality: Nissewaard

Population
  - Total: ca. 2,700

Heenvliet is a town in the Dutch province of South Holland. It is a part of the municipality of Nissewaard, and lies about 7 km south of Maassluis, on the Brielse Maas.

Heenvliet was a separate municipality until 1980, when it became part of Bernisse.

In 2001, the town of Heenvliet had 2,675 inhabitants. The built-up area of the town was 0.36 km^{2}, and contained 1,064 residences. The wider statistical district of Heenvliet, which covers that part of the "Polder Heenvliet" that is in Bernisse, has a population of around 2,700. The historic ruins of Ravesteyn Castle are located in the town.

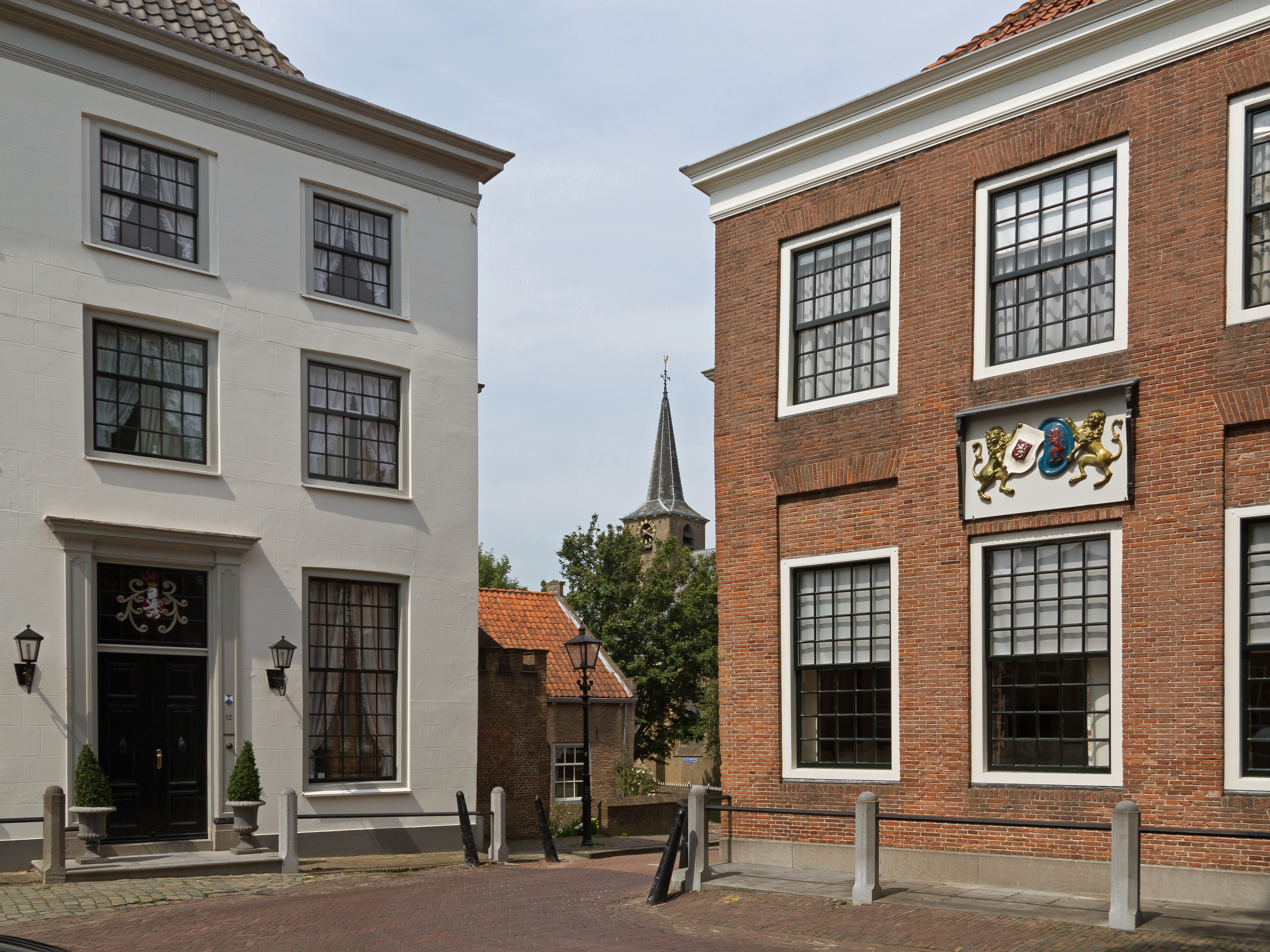
Heenvliet, Markt with churchtower
