= Augusta Peaux =

Dutch poet (1859–1944)

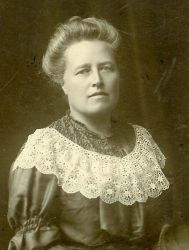

Augusta Guerdina Peaux (2 November 1859 – 23 February 1944) was a Dutch poet. She began her publishing career as a writer of prose fiction, in literary magazines and in one collection, and in the early 1900s started publishing poetry, in magazines associated with the literary movement known as the Tachtigers, with whom she became associated. With her sister Johanna, she translated poetry by Dante Gabriel Rossetti and Algernon Charles Swinburne, and with her friend Truus, with whom she shared a love for Iceland and its literature, she translated stories from the Edda. Two volumes of her poetry were published; she never sought literary fame, though some fame came to her posthumously.

== Biography ==
Augusta Guerdina Peaux was born in Simonshaven, a small village in South Holland, where her father, Pieter Peaux (1835–1914), was a preacher, as were his father and grandfather; her mother was Louisa Cornelia Gerarda Prince (1834–1917). She was the oldest of five. In 1864 the family moved to the parish house of nearby Zwartewaal, and in 1868 to Etten and Hoeven in Brabant, where Pieter Peaux took over the position of his dead father. The children spent much of their time playing outside, in nature, and Augusta had the later poet Jacques Perk, the same age as she, as a playmate. Since they now lived in a predominantly Catholic area, the Peaux family occupied a special position, and the two girls were taught at home by teachers brought in from Holland.

Beginning in 1873 Augusta attended the MMS in Dordrecht, probably while living in a boarding house. The whole family moved to Haarlem in 1875 because her father temporarily stepped down from his position (for health reasons, it seems), where Augusta finished her schooling and achieved a certificate in French. A good drawer, she also attended a school for applied arts. In the following years, her father went back to the ministry and moved around, the family moving with him: in 1881 to Wijk aan Zee, in 1896 to Gulpen and Valkenburg. In this period Augusta helped her sister Johanna, who had already become a critic of literature, with translating poetry. In 1889 Augusta translated fourteen of the twenty-four stanzas of Dante Gabriel Rossetti's The Blessed Damozel, which accompanied (and were interspersed with) an article by her sister on Rossetti--the first translation of the poem in Dutch. In 1893 the two published a translation of parts of Algernon Charles Swinburne's verse drama Chastelard (1864).

=== Literary career ===
Peaux's publishing career started in 1892, when she began publishing short stories in Eigen Haard, a popular magazine published in Haarlem by Arie Cornelis Kruseman. From Gulpen she regularly sent poems to Albert Verwey, who published them in two of his magazines, Tweemaandelijksch Tijdschrift and De XXe eeuw, and praised her "little verses". She was hesitant to publish collections of her poems fearing a negative response, but did publish a collection of stories in 1899, Op Goudgrond. A negative review by Frans Coenen in De Kroniek made her refrain from collecting and publishing her own work, though she continued to publish prose fiction in Eigen Haard. She was drawn to Scandinavia and especially Iceland, where she imagined silent landscapes without people. Literary critic Mea Verwey later praised her prose stories, saying they evidenced a "great heart" and a love for nature and fairy tale.

When her father retired in 1901, she moved to Nijmegen with her parents. By then she was 42 and no longer shared her parents' faith; her poetry had no place for Christ, only for pre-Christian gods and an animated nature. She became involved, even if tentatively, with the suffragist movement, becoming friends with people involved in the Vereeniging voor Vrouwenkiesrecht, especially Betsy Perk, the aunt of her childhood friend Jacques. She also contributed to the local drama societies, and she found a few younger friends among the actors who recited her poetry. One of those was Geertruida (Truus) Meuleman, who lived on the same street as Peaux and was the daughter of the rector of the local gymnasium. Meuleman was educated to be a teacher, and the two shared a love for Scandinavian literature and landscape. (In 1917, they published a translation of the story of Þrymr as they found it in the Edda.) When in 1909 De XXe eeuw merged into De Nieuwe Gids and became the best-known outlet for the Tachtigers, Peaux became acquainted with Willem Kloos. Starting in 1911 she published her poetry in the magazine, and Kloos, with whom she corresponded, asked her to publish her childhood recollections of Jacques Perk, who had died in 1881.

=== Poetry collections, later years ===
In 1918, the year she turned 59, she published her first collection of poetry, Gedichten, with Tjeenk Willink. In these "nature poems", as one reviewer called them, natural images and landscapes are central. Peaux expresses her revulsion of World War I, which robbed people of the landscape; Mea Verwey noted the shock effect of World War I on the poet, who now stands estranged from her mother, nature. Verwey also comments that there is little change in the poems, even though they comprise the work of a lifetime, and that Peaux excels in the "small" images but that the introspective poems are the weakest. Kloos praised her poetry in a lengthy review in De Nieuwe Gids, in which he recalled how Jacques Perk first alerted him to her work; at the time, he was puzzled by the fact that there were only two good young talented poets in the country, and Perk offered Peaux as a third. He spoke positively of her imagery and the lyrical quality of her poems, which he said come from an electric spark which only momentarily shows itself but is always palpable. Peaux, he said, is "one of the real poets, whose psychic impressions come from the inner soul, in the way in which they are conceived there by the mediation of the surrounding reality, and then come forth, carried by the mood which results from their coming into existence, uttering itself in song through the rhyme and measure of the verse". J. D. Bierens de Haan, in a short review, saw mostly short, "tasteful" poems, whose naivete was refreshing in troubling times. The collection was reprinted in 1923. In 1926 she published Nieuwe gedichten, also with Tjeenk Willink.

Peaux traveled through Iceland in 1923, with two friends, Truus Meuleman and Willy van Hooff. They sought and found an "Iceland of the imagination", always accompanied by the Edda. Afterward, she lectured on and wrote about her journey. Later, Peaux and Meuleman traveled in the South of France and Denmark. In 1929, on the occasion of her 70th birthday, poet J. C. Bloem wrote an appraisal of her work, the best of which, he said, had a "curious, wild grandiosity" that he appreciated and that, he said, is rarely found among women. But after 1930 life became more difficult for Peaux as her physical and mental health began to suffer, though her friend Truus Meuleman continued to support her. In 1935, Peaux suffered from depression, which would revisit her in 1942. She remained in Nijmegen, with a brief stay in The Hague in 1940. She died in a boarding house on 23 February 1944, of pneumonia, one day after the Americans bombed the city. She was buried at the cemetery Rustoord in Nijmegen, in the family grave; her name is not on the gravestone.

=== Legacy ===
Peaux was written up in local newspapers on her 75th and 80th birthdays, and portrayed as one of the famous Tachtigers; while she deserved to be better known she had no wish to seek the spotlight, according to a newspaper article from 1939. After her death, her "Eenzaam kerkhof" was regularly included in anthologies of poetry, and Gerrit Komrij included that and seven other of her poems in his De Nederlandse poëzie van de 19de en 20ste eeuw in 1000 en enige gedichten. Her work was republished in 2014, edited by Mario Molegraaf, with an extensive biography. A poetry festival named for Peaux is held in Simonshaven since 2016.

== Publications ==
=== Prose ===
- Op goudgrond (collection of stories, 1899)
- "Jeudgherinnering aan Jacques Perk" (1931)
- "J.R. Klein-Peaux, Geervliet 19 Januari 1864 – Oosterbeek 30 Juni 1933" (1935)

=== Poetry ===
- "Fragmenten uit Swinburne's Chastelard", with Johanna R. Klein-Peaux
- "Vervallen woning", "Een avond", "Als toen", "Calle barozzi" (1901)
- "Stadstuin", "Stemming", "De berk" (1911)
- "De herinnering" (1912)
- "Het lied van Thrym" (with G. E. G. Meuleman, 1917)
- "Bladvulling" (1926)
- "Weelde" (1930)
- "In laten herfst", "Het oerwoud", "De kolenkar", "De vogelvrij verklaarde" (1935)

==== Collections ====
- Gedichten (1918)
- Nieuwe gedichten (1926)
- De wilgen, de velden, het water – Augusta Peaux, ed. Mario Molegraaf (Dordrecht: Liverse, 2014) ISBN 978 94 91034 42 8
