= Biert, Bernisse =

Biert
- Buurtschap
- Coat of arms
- Interactive map of Biert
- Coordinates: 51°49′37″N 4°16′16″E
- Country: Netherlands
- Province: South Holland
- Municipality: Nissewaard

Biert is a hamlet in the Dutch province of South Holland. It is located in the municipality of Nissewaard, about 3 km west of Spijkenisse.

Biert was a separate municipality between 1817 and 1855, when it became part of Geervliet.
