= Aad Andriessen =

Dutch footballer (1960–2021)

Personal information
- Full name: Adrianus Andriessen
- Date of birth: 13 December 1960
- Place of birth: Rotterdam, Netherlands
- Date of death: 4 December 2021 (aged 60)
- Place of death: Rotterdam, Netherlands
- Position: Centre-back

Senior career*
Years	Team	Apps	(Gls)
1980–1987	Sparta	140	(4)

Managerial career
- ASWH (youth)
- Sparta '30
- Excelsior Maassluis
- Nieuwenhoorn
- 1997–1998: Zwaluwen
- Capelle
- 2001–2003: Lyra
- 2003–2004: Heerjansdam
- 2004–2007: Achilles Veen
- 2007–2008: SSV '65
- 2008–2014?: XerxesDZB
- 2017–2018: Zuidland
- 2018–2021: Sparta (scout)
- * Club domestic league appearances and goals

Adrianus "Aad" Andriessen (13 December 1960 – 4 December 2021) was a Dutch footballer. He played for Sparta Rotterdam as a central defender from 1980 until 1987 when a knee injury forced him to retire. He went on to become a trainer in the regional amateur leagues.

== Biography ==
In 1980, Andriessen made his début for Sparta Rotterdam after he had played in the club's youth. In his third season there, he became central defender for the team. On 2 October 1985, he scored from a penalty against Hamburger SV during a UEFA Cup match which resulted in a victory for Sparta. In 1987, a knee injury forced Andriessen to retire. He made a total of 157 official appearances for Sparta.

Andriessen went on to become a trainer of amateur teams, starting on an ASWH youth team. He worked for Excelsior Maassluis, VV Zwaluwen, VV Capelle, VV Heerjansdam, Achilles Veen among others. He was also active as scout for Sparta.

In 2012, Andriessen suffered a cerebral infarction. He died on 4 December 2021 in Rotterdam, at the age of 60.
