= Oudenhoorn =

- Village
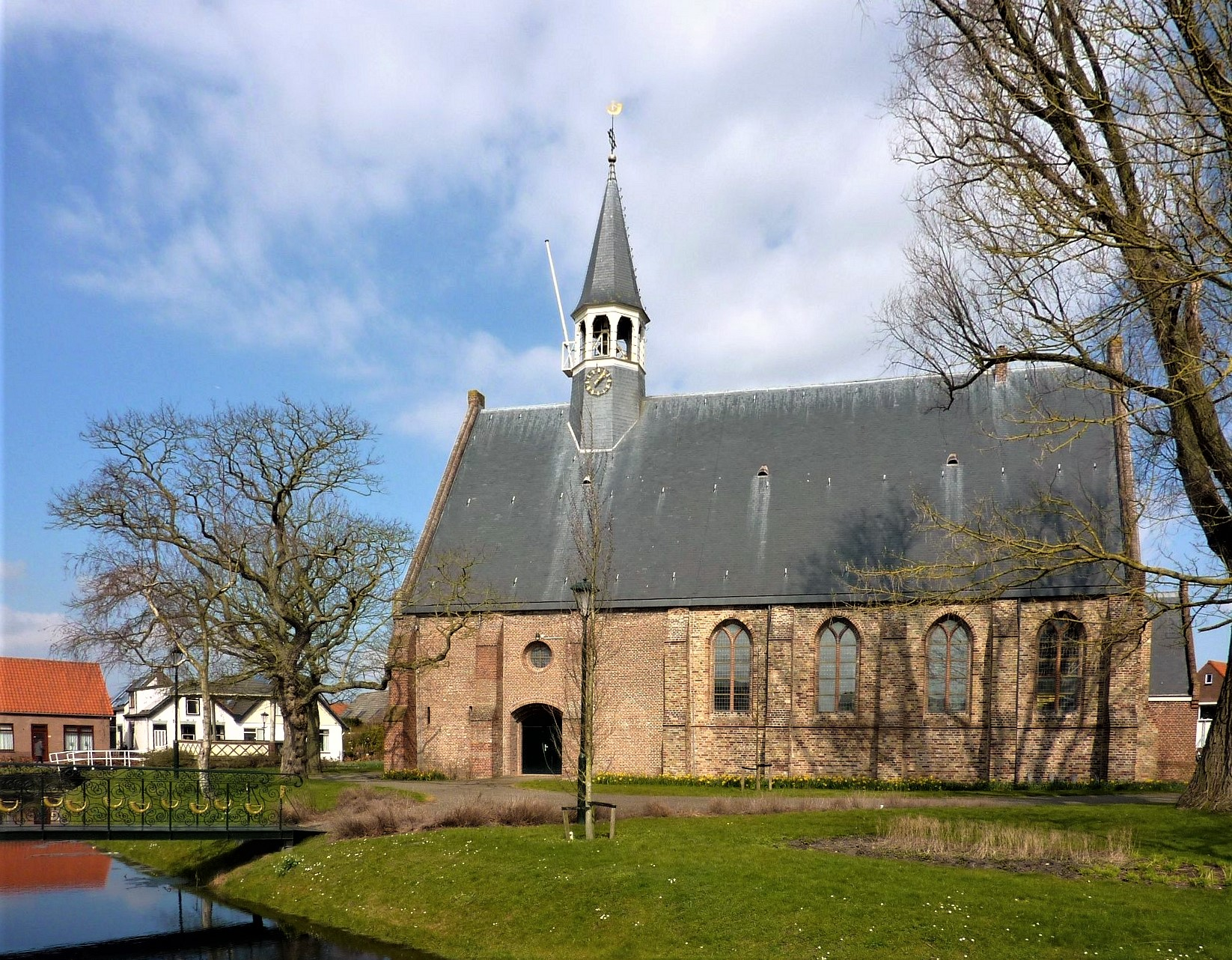
- Dutch Reformed church

- Coat of arms

- Location in the province of South Holland in the Netherlands Location in the Netherlands
- Coordinates: 51°50′N 4°12′E
- Country: Netherlands
- Province: South Holland
- Municipality: Voorne aan Zee

Area
  - Total: 9.69 km^{2} (3.74 sq mi)
- Elevation: −0.4 m (−1.3 ft)

Population (2021)
  - Total: 1,225
  - Density: 126/km^{2} (327/sq mi)
- Time zone: UTC+1 (CET)
  - Summer (DST): UTC+2 (CEST)
- Postal code: 3227
- Dialing code: 0181

Oudenhoorn is a village in the Dutch province of South Holland. It is part of the municipality of Voorne aan Zee and lies about 3 km east of Hellevoetsluis.

The village was first mentioned in 1356 as "den Hoorn". The current name means "old corner (of a dike)". The eponymous polder was created in 1356 by order of Machteld van Voorne. Oud (old) has been added to distinguish from Nieuwenhoorn.

Oudenhoorn was an independent municipality until 1980 when it was merged into Bernisse. In 2015, it became part of Hellevoetsluis.

== Gallery ==
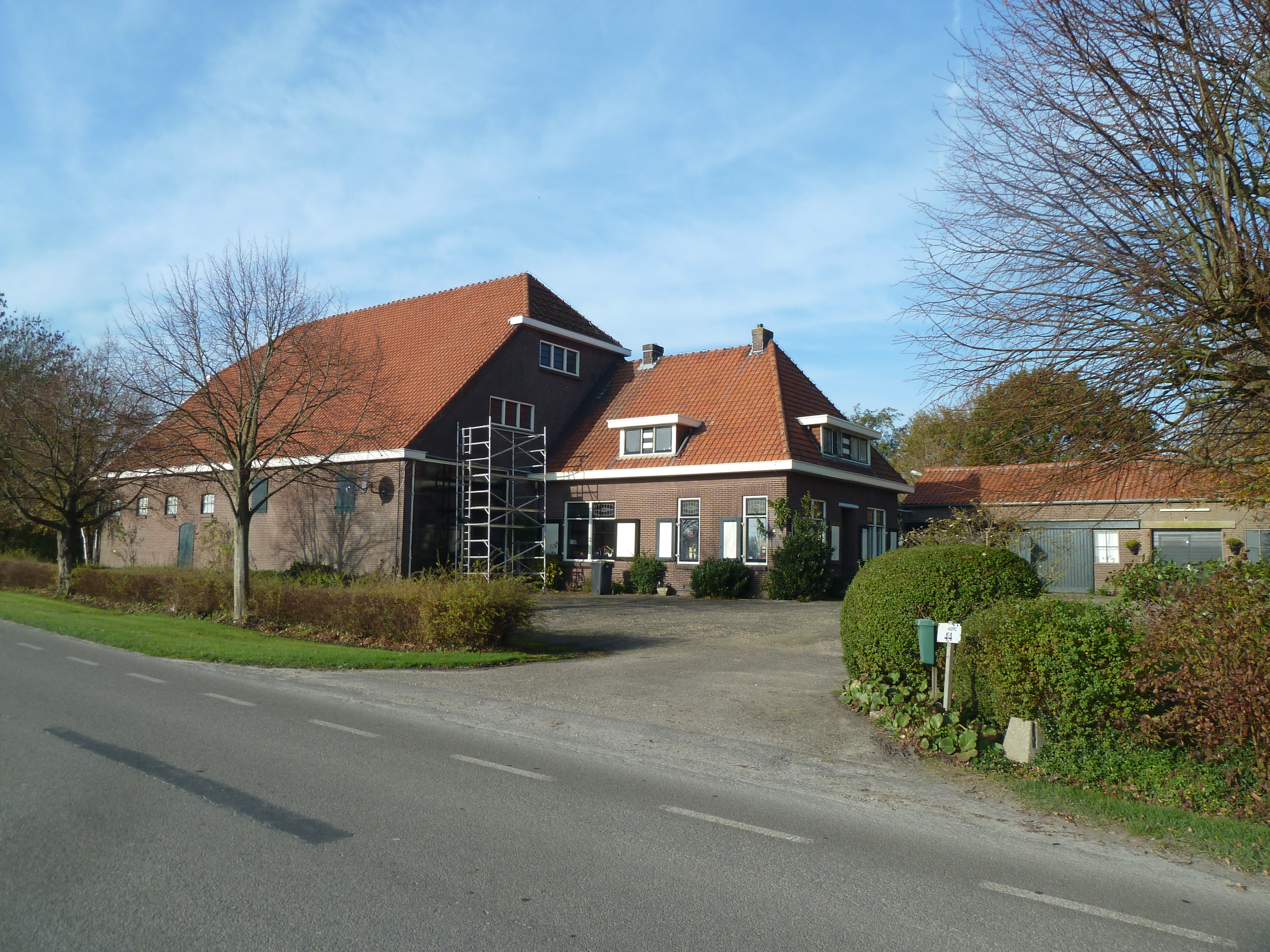
Farm in Oudenhoorn

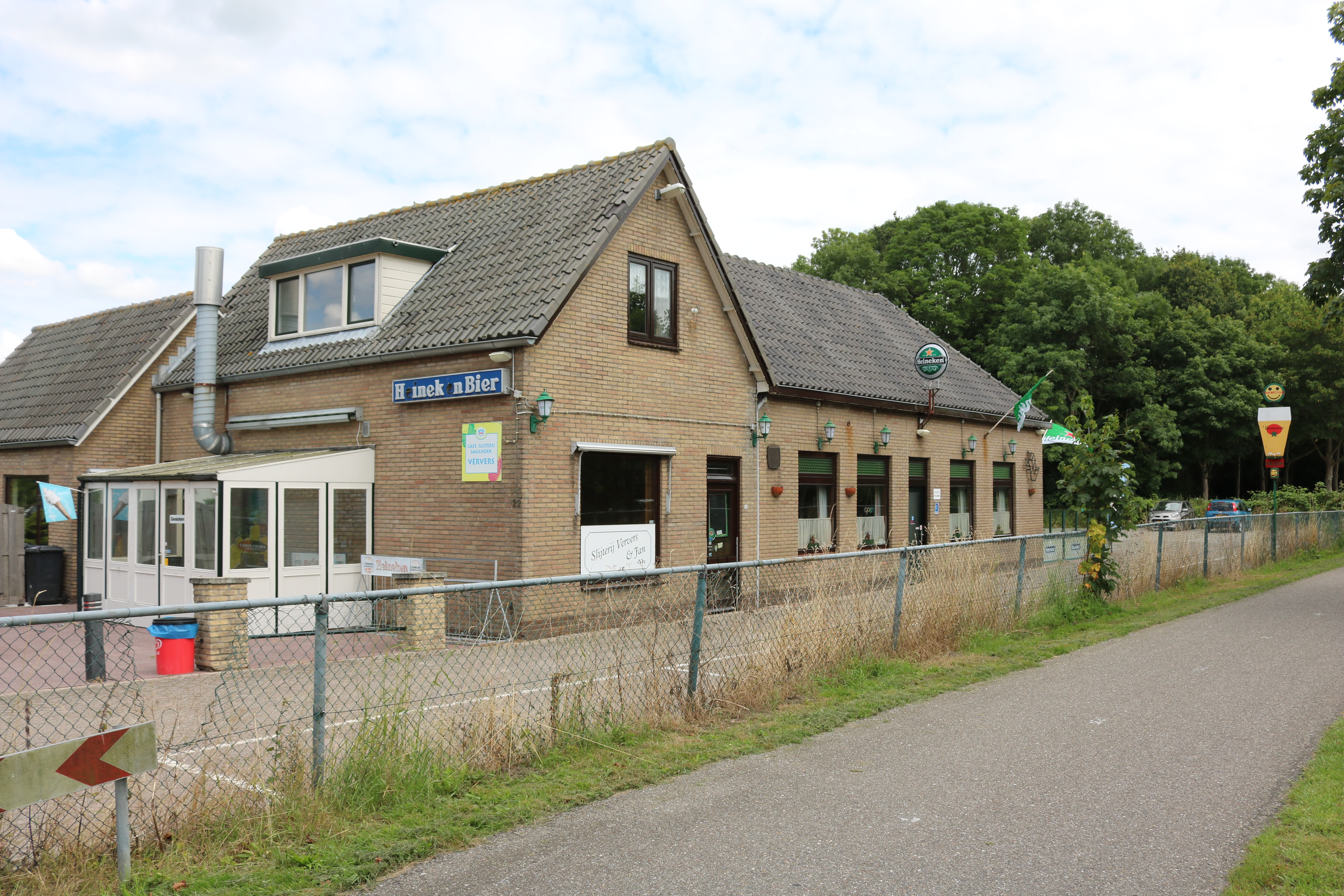
Former tram station. Nowadays pub

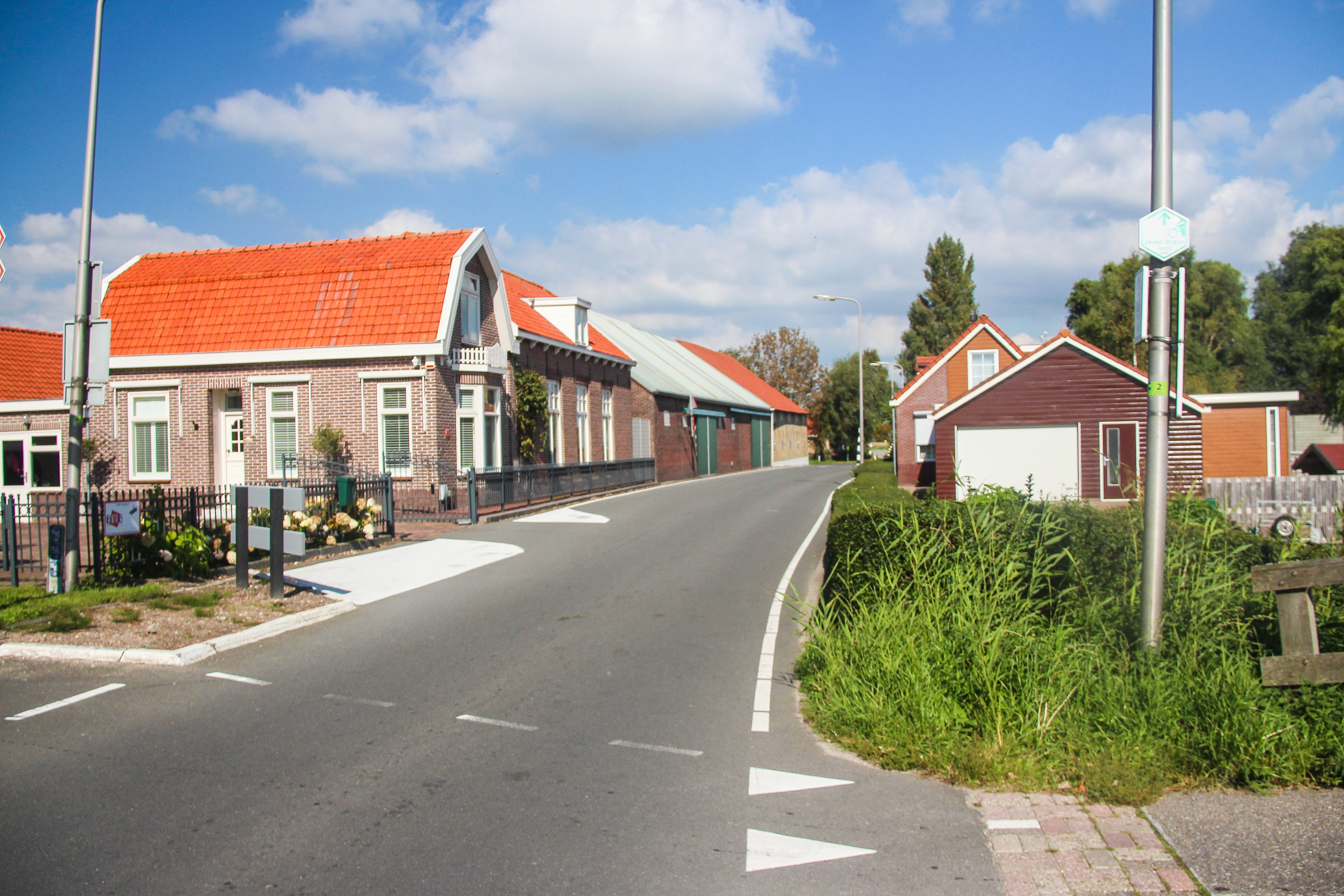
Street view

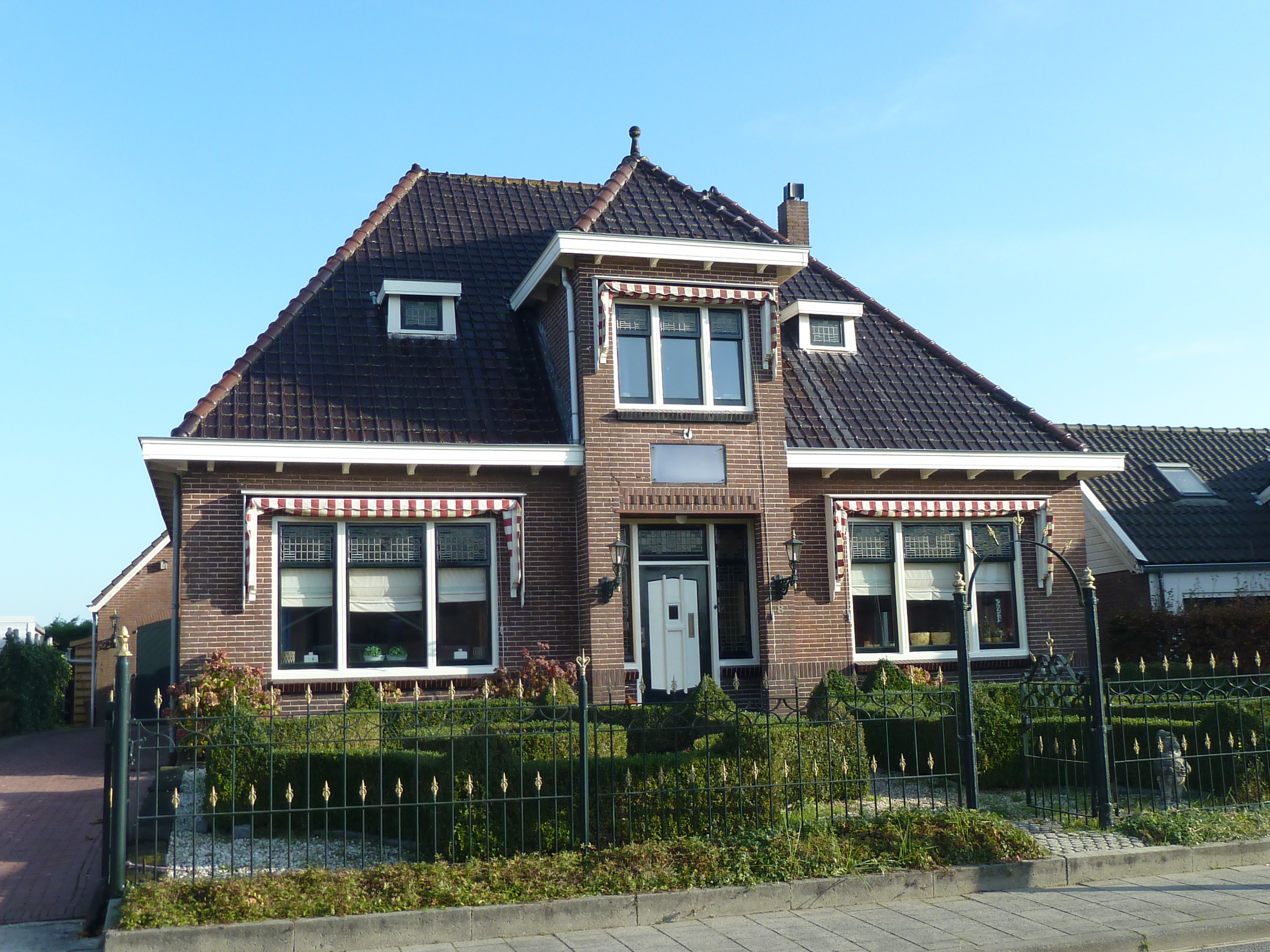
Farm in Oudenhoorn
