= Alexander van Oudenaarden =

Dutch biophysicist and systems biologist

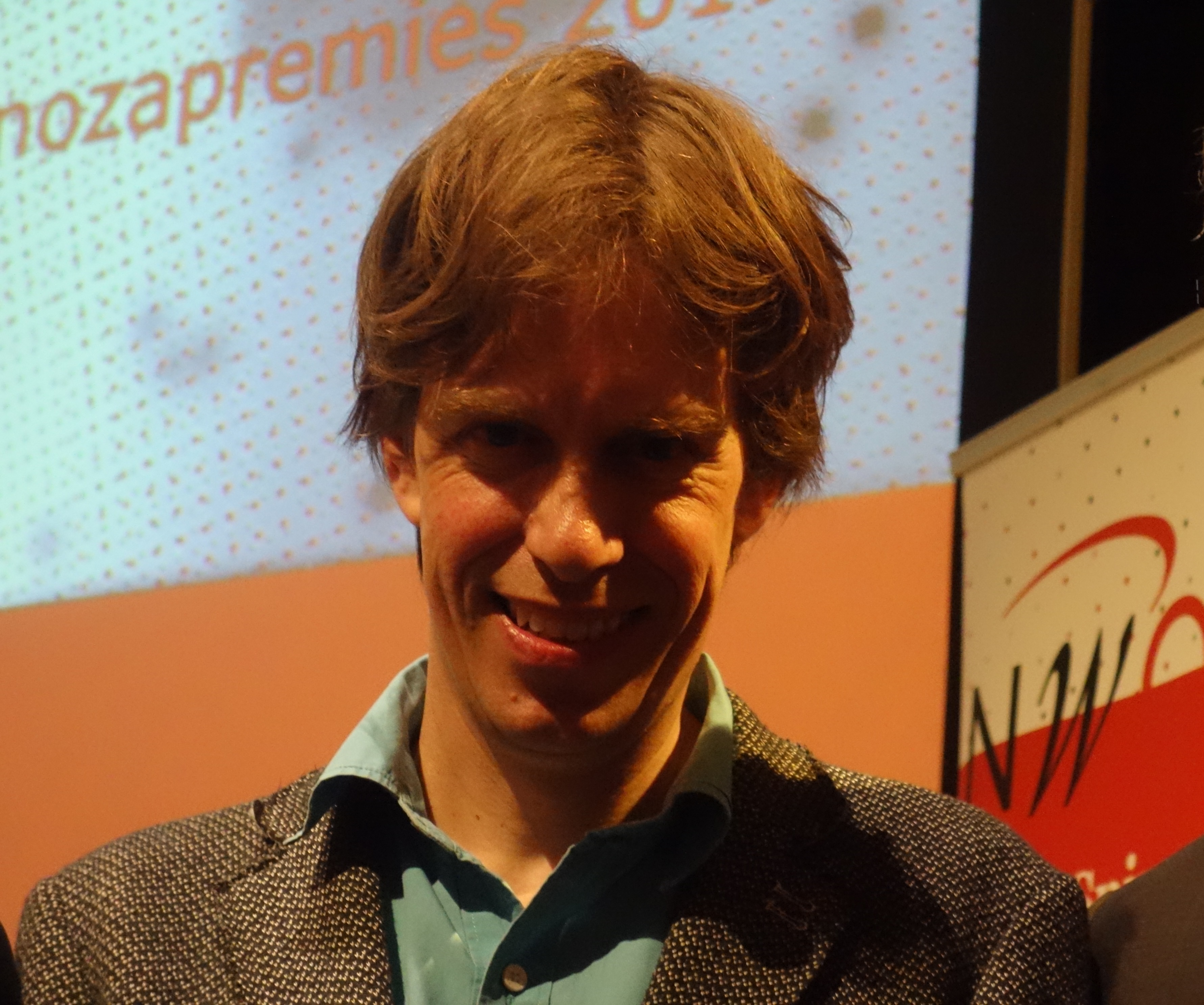
- Alexander van Oudenaarden (2017)
- Born: 19 March 1970 (age 56); Zuidland, The Netherlands
- Citizenship: Kingdom of the Netherlands
- Education: Delft University of Technology (MSc, MSc, PhD)
- Scientific career
- Fields: Biophysics, Systems biology, Synthetic biology
- Workplaces: Hubrecht Institute

Alexander van Oudenaarden (19 March 1970) is a Dutch biophysicist and systems biologist. He is a researcher in stem cell biology, specialising in single cell techniques. In 2012 he started as director of the Hubrecht Institute and was awarded three times an ERC Advanced Grant, in 2012, 2017, and 2022. He was awarded the Spinoza Prize in 2017.

== Biography ==
Van Oudenaarden was born 19 March 1970, in Zuidland, a small town in the Dutch province of South Holland. He studied at the Delft University of Technology, where he obtained an MSc degree in Materials Science and Engineering (cum laude) and an MSc degree in Physics, both in 1993, and subsequently a PhD degree in Physics (cum laude) in 1998 in experimental condensed matter physics, under the supervision of professor J.E. Mooij. He received the Andries Miedema Award (best doctoral research in the field of condensed matter physics in the Netherlands) for his thesis on "Quantum vortices and quantum interference effects in circuits of small tunnel junctions". In 1998, he moved to Stanford University, where he was a postdoctoral researcher in the departments of Biochemistry and of Microbiology & Immunology, working on force generation of polymerising actin filaments in the Theriot lab and a postdoctoral researcher in the department of Chemistry, working on Micropatterning of supported phospholipid bi-layers in the Boxer lab. In 2000 he joined the department of Physics at MIT as an assistant professor, was tenured in 2004 and became a full professor. In 2001 he received the NSF CAREER award, and was both an Alfred Sloan Research Fellow and the Keck Career Development Career Development Professor in Biomedical Engineering. In 2012 Alexander became the director of the Hubrecht Institute as the successor of Hans Clevers. In 2017 he received his second ERC Advanced Grant, for his study titled "a single-cell genomics approach integrating gene expression, lineage, and physical interactions". In 2022 he received his third ERC Advanced Grant, titled "scTranslatomics".

In 2014 van Oudenaarden became a member of the Royal Netherlands Academy of Arts and Sciences. In 2017 he was one of four winners of the Spinoza Prize. In 2022 he was elected to the American Academy of Arts and Sciences (International Honorary Member).

He is married and has three children.

== Work ==
During his time at MIT his lab started with parallel lines of research in actin dynamics and noise in gene networks, and then focused on stochasticity in gene networks biological networks as control systems, and the evolution of small networks.

Today, van Oudenaarden works at the Hubrecht Institute and focuses on stochastic gene expression, developing new tools for quantifying gene expression in single cells and MicroRNAs.
