= Nieuwenhoorn =

- Village
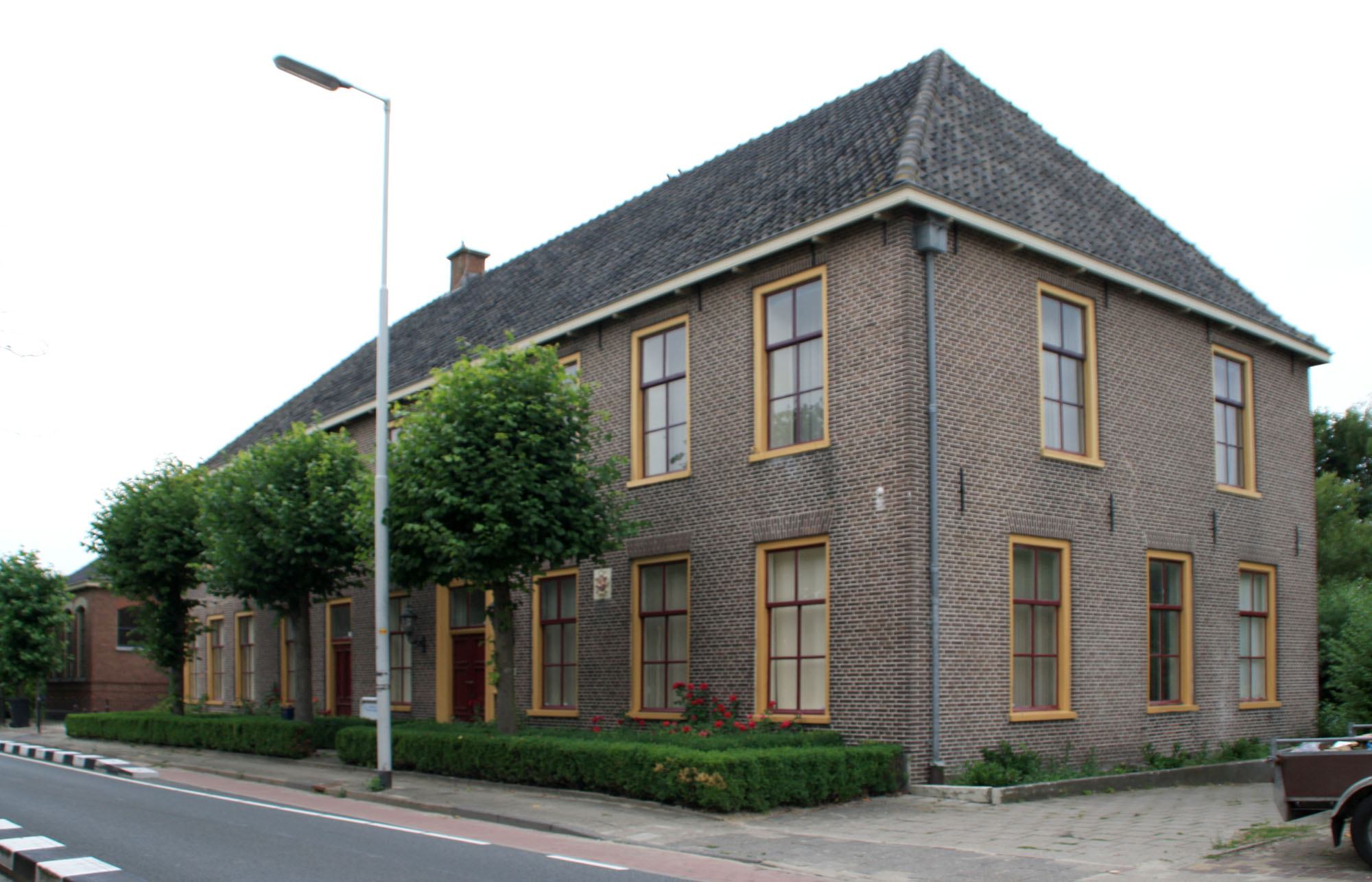
- Court house

- Location in the province of South Holland in the Netherlands Location in the Netherlands
- Coordinates: 51°51′15″N 4°8′43″E
- Country: Netherlands
- Province: South Holland
- Municipality: Voorne aan Zee

Area
  - Total: 1.16 km^{2} (0.45 sq mi)
- Elevation: −0.1 m (−0.33 ft)

Population (2021)
  - Total: 1,295
  - Density: 1,120/km^{2} (2,890/sq mi)
- Time zone: UTC+1 (CET)
  - Summer (DST): UTC+2 (CEST)
- Postal code: 3223
- Dialing code: 0181

Nieuwenhoorn is a village in the Dutch province of South Holland. It is located in the municipality of Voorne aan Zee, about 3 km north of Hellevoetsluis city centre.

== History ==
The village was first mentioned in 1390 as "van den nuwen hoern", and is named after the shoals south of the eponymous polder which was created in 1386. Nieuw (new) has been added to distinguish from Oudenhoorn. Nieuwenhoorn developed as a dike village. In 1821, the Dorpsstraat (village street) was widened and it started to transform into a front street village.

The Dutch Reformed church is a single aisled church with a modest tower. The tower probably dates from the 15th century. The nave dates from the early 16th century. In 1851, the transept and choir were demolished to be replaced by a consistory in neoclassic style. Fort Noorddijk is a fortress built between 1883 and 1884 to protect the mouth of the Maas and Haringvliet. The fortress has become home to a colony of bats.

The grist mill Zeezicht was built in 1717. The windmill was in service until 1966. It became home to an art and antique dealer who used to windmill as a billboard. Between 1994 and 1997, it was restored. In 2009, it was sold to the municipality and occasionally in service.

Nieuwenhoorn was home to 1,019 people in 1840. It was a separate municipality until 1960, when it became part of Hellevoetsluis. The place signs have been replaced by a sign which reads Hellevoetsluis on top and Nieuwenhoorn below.

== Gallery ==
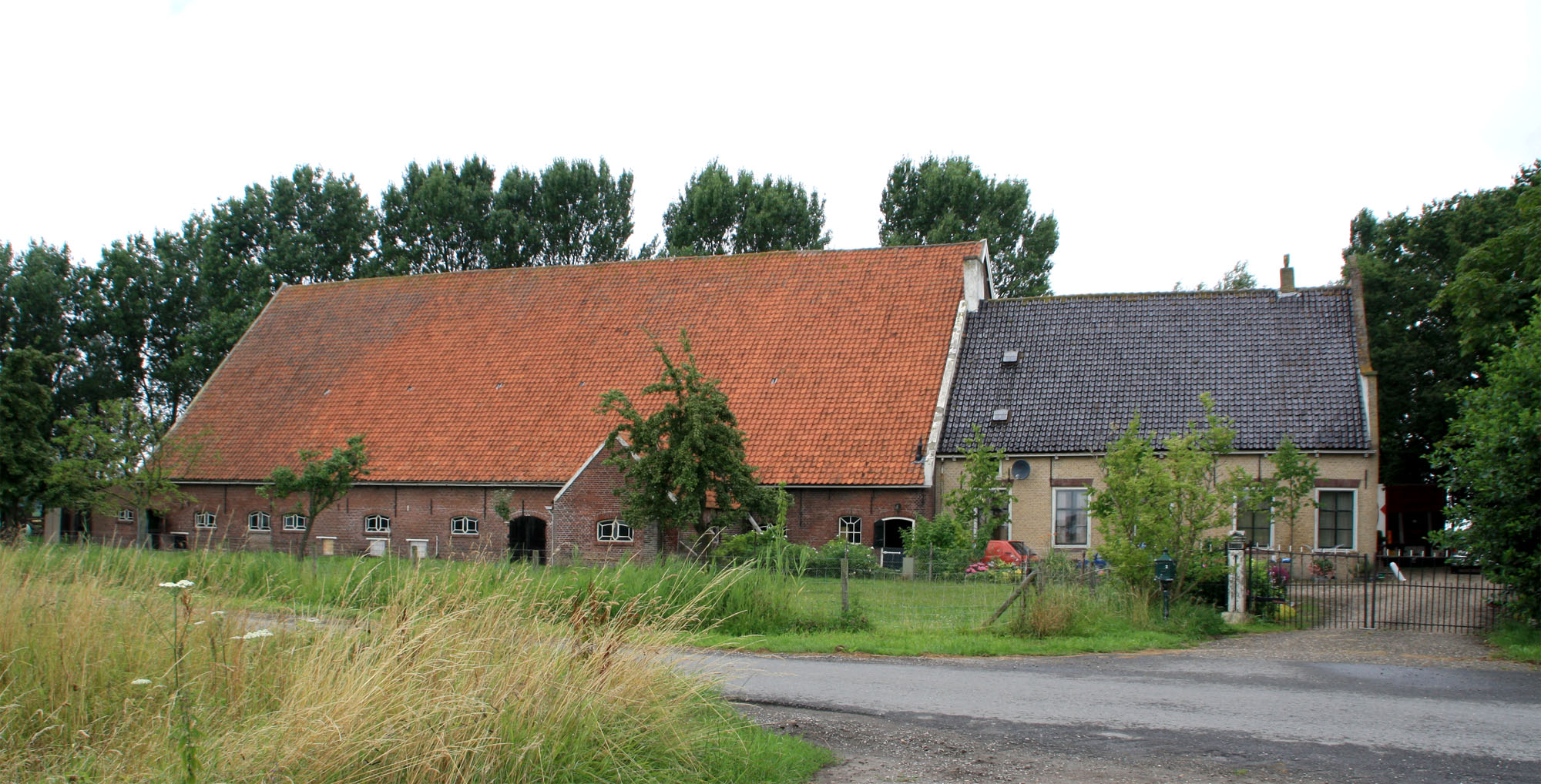
Farm in Nieuwenhoorn

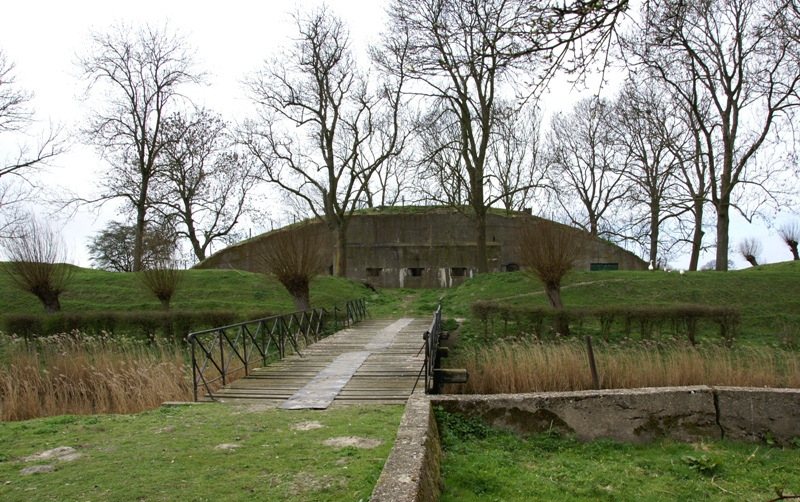
Fort op de Noorddijk

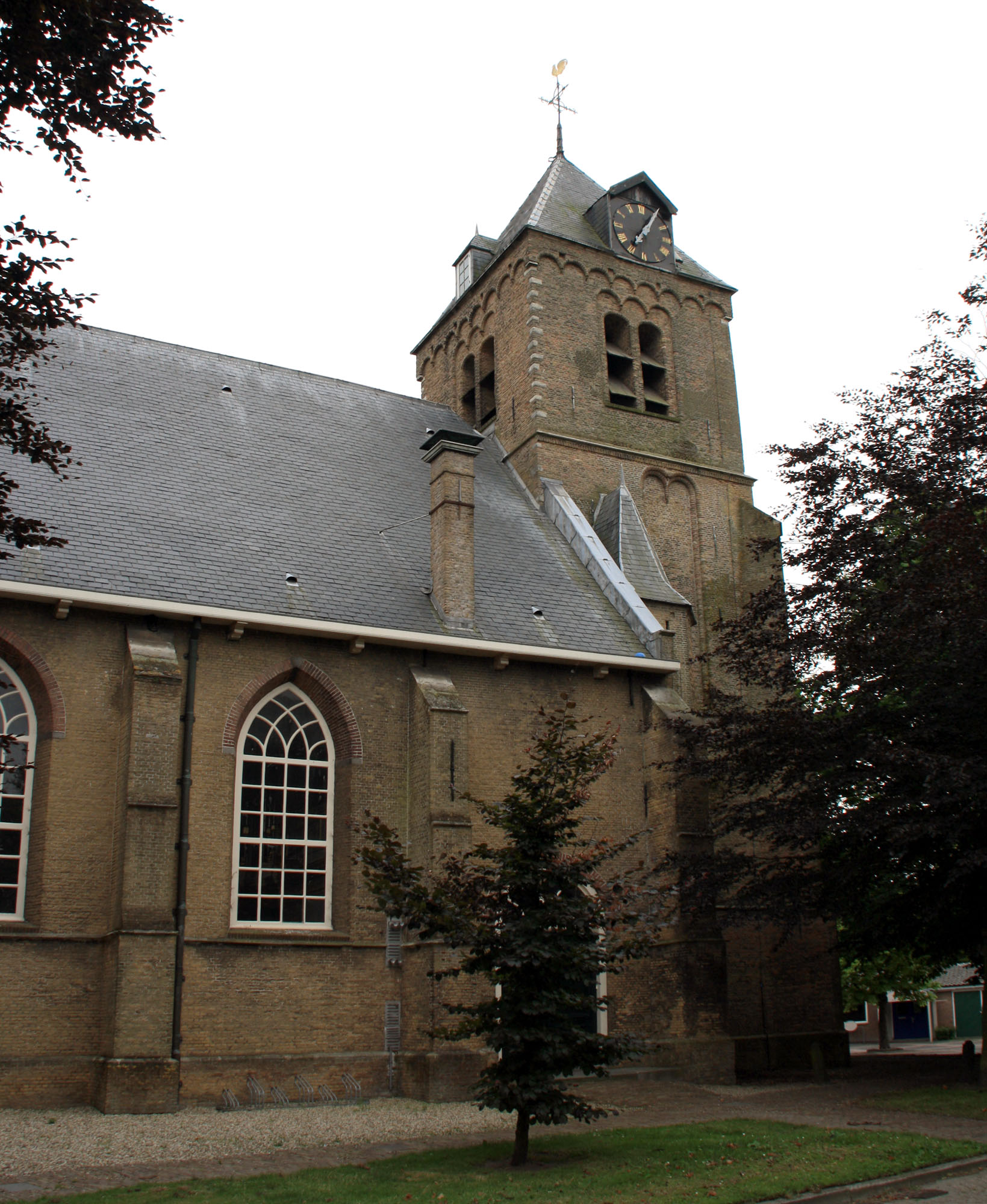
Dutch Reformed Church

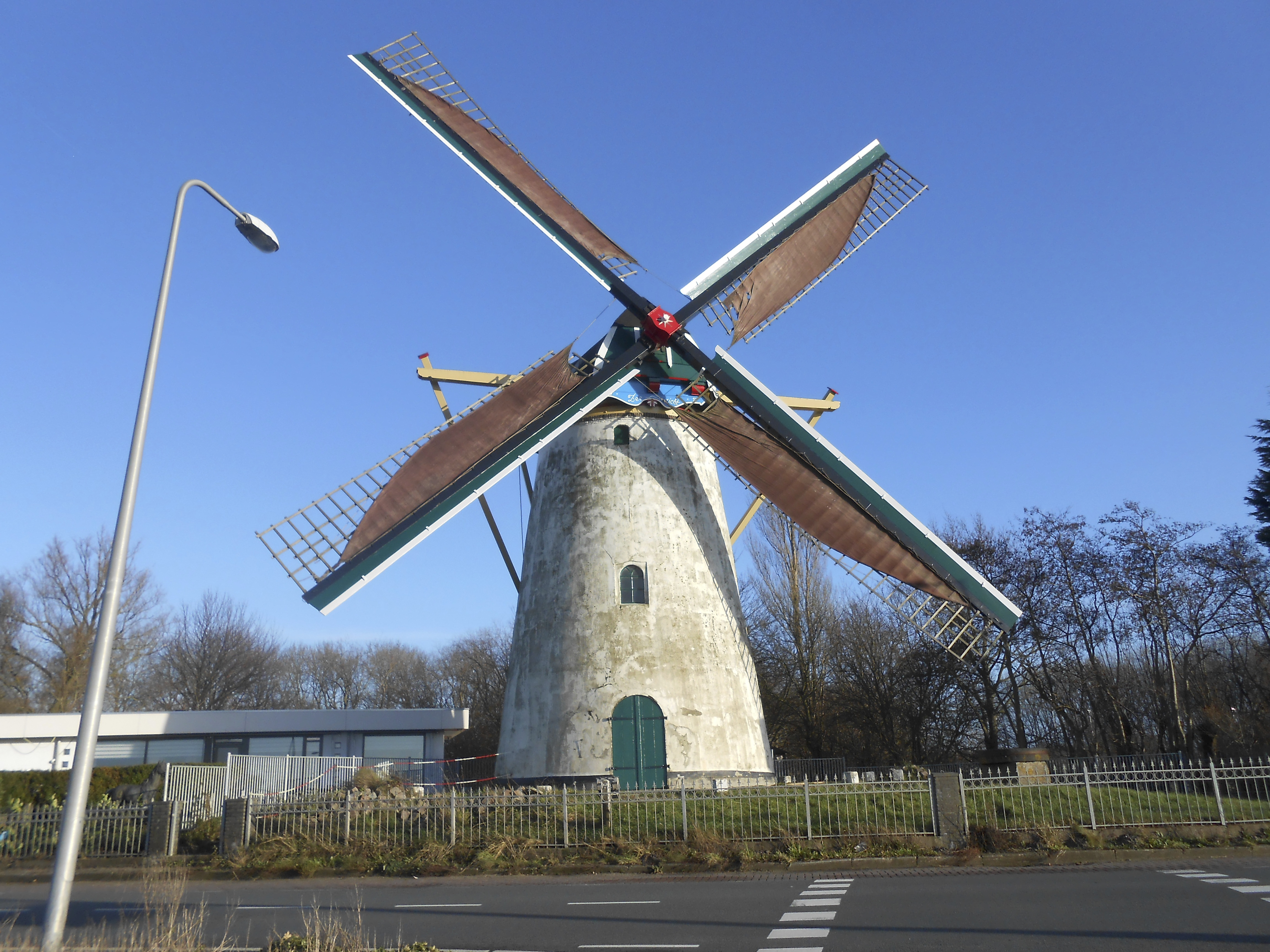
Windmill Zeezicht
