= Nissewaard =

- Municipality
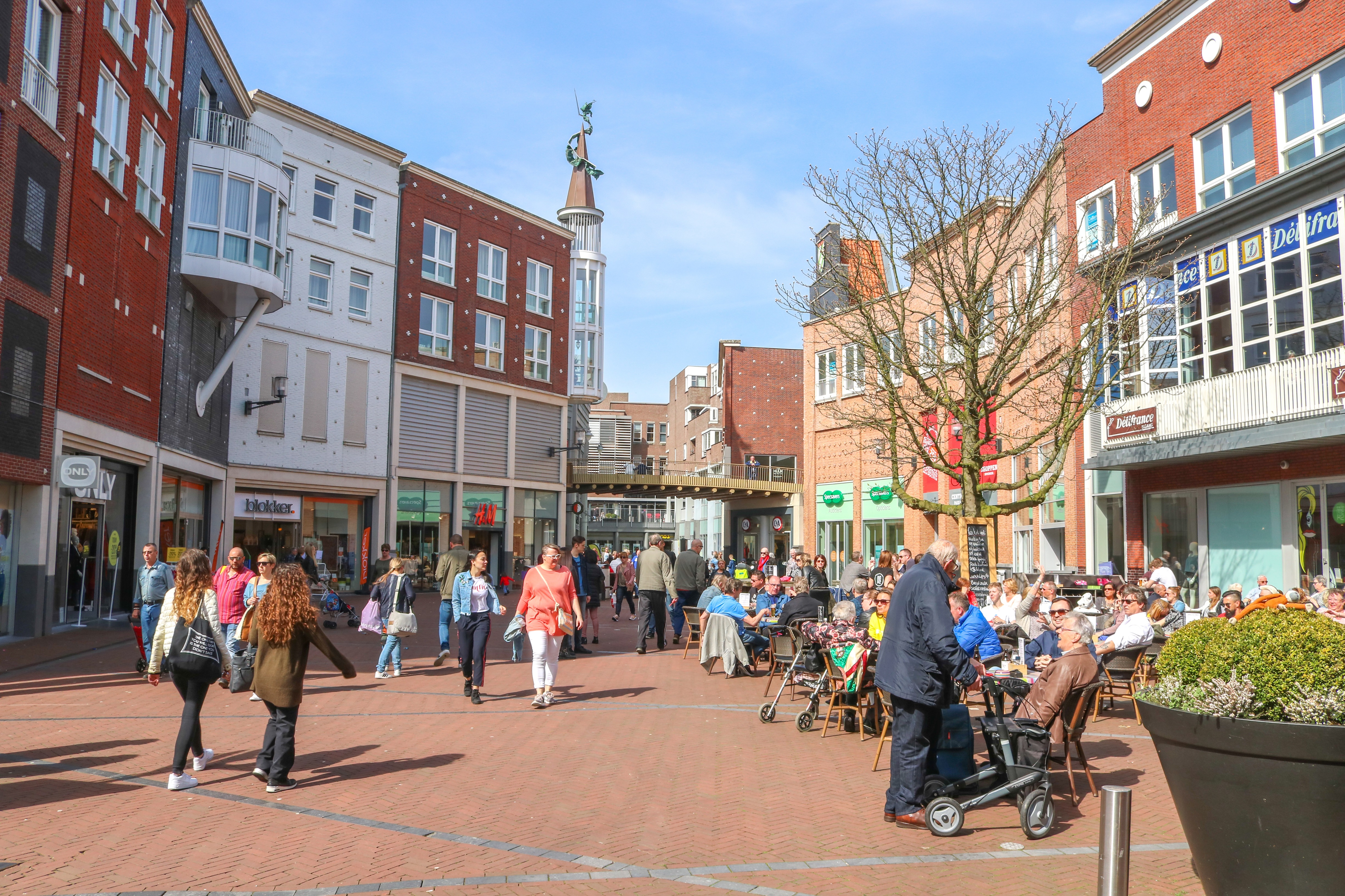
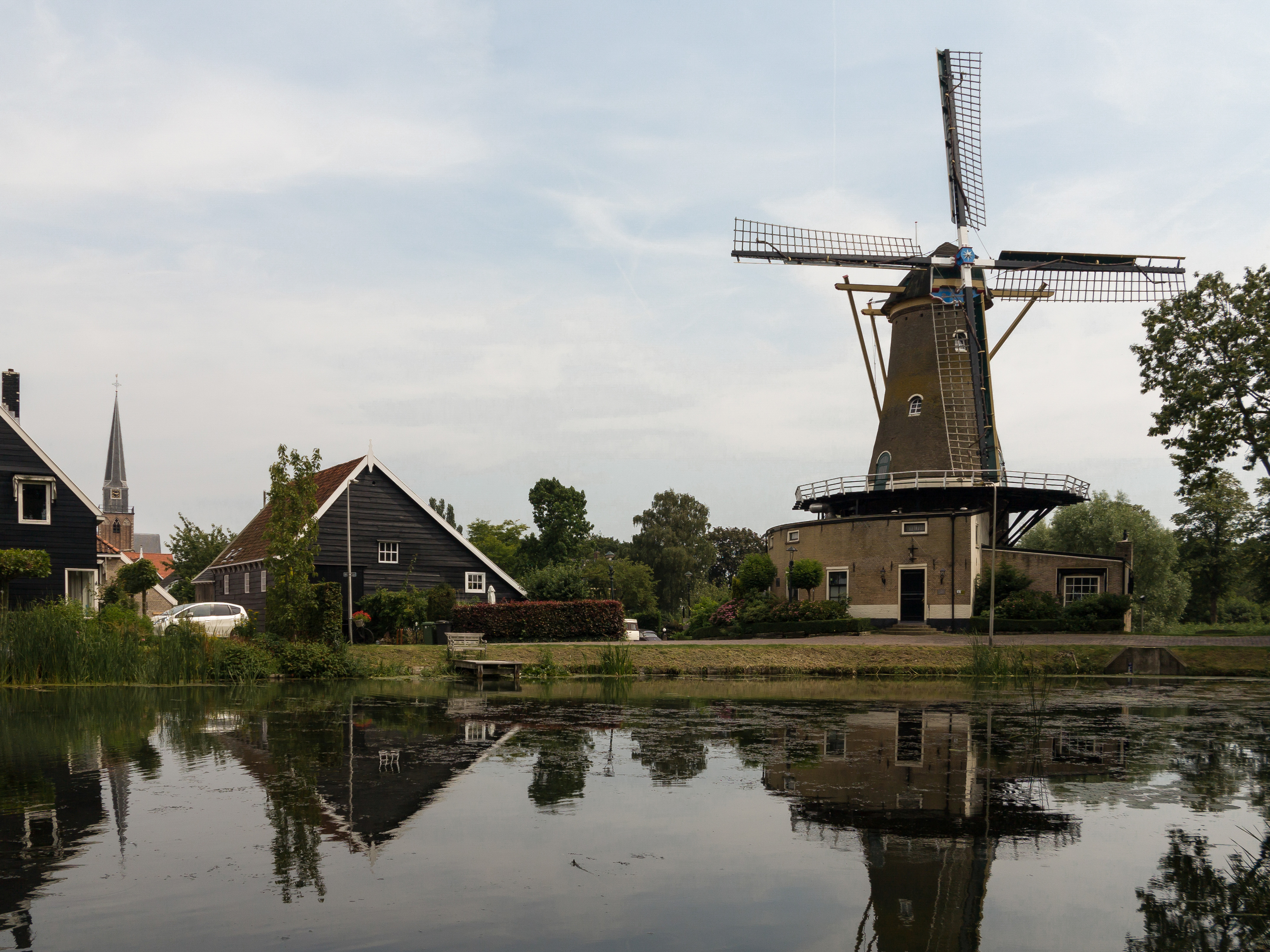
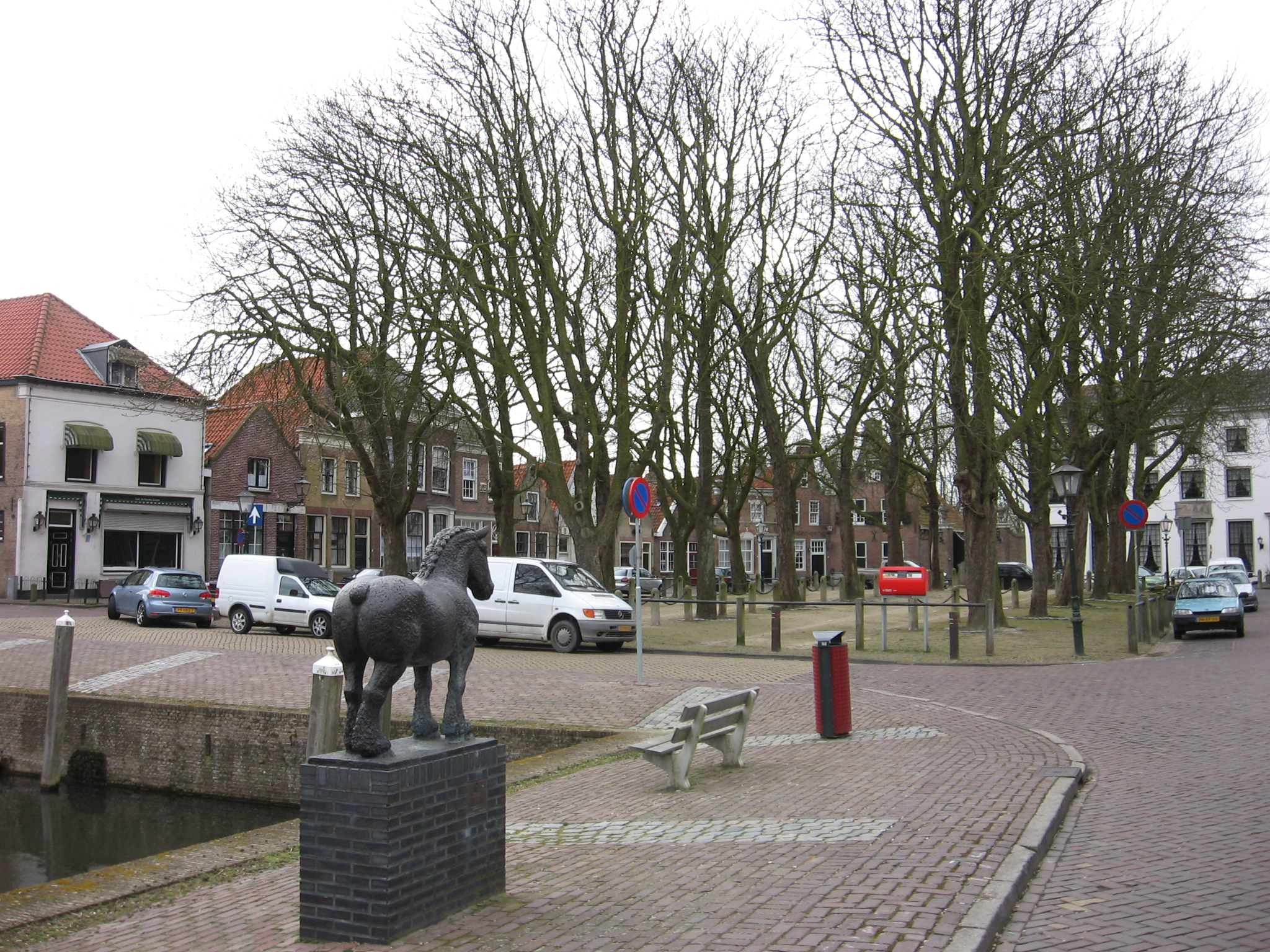
- City centre of Spijkenisse Geervliet, windmill: de Bernissemolen Heenvliet market

- Flag Coat of arms

- Location in South Holland
- Coordinates: 51.8283°N 4.2792°E
- Country: Netherlands
- Province: South Holland
- Established: 1 January 2015

Government
  - Body: Municipal council
  - Mayor (acting): Cor Lamers (CDA)

Area
  - Total: 83.79 km^{2} (32.35 sq mi)
  - Land: 73.58 km^{2} (28.41 sq mi)
  - Water: 10.21 km^{2} (3.94 sq mi)

Population (January 2021)
  - Total: 85,440
  - Density: 1,161/km^{2} (3,010/sq mi)
- Time zone: UTC+1 (CET)
  - Summer (DST): UTC+2 (CEST)
- Postcode: 3200–3209, 3211, 3212, 3214, 3216, 3218, 3227
- Area code: 0181
- Website: www.nissewaard.nl

Nissewaard (Dutch pronunciation: [ˈnɪsəˌʋaːrt]) is a municipality in the Netherlands, located on the island of Voorne-Putten, in the south of the province of South Holland. It was created through a merger of the municipalities of Spijkenisse and Bernisse on 1 January 2015.

Nissewaard has a population of about 85,000 as of 2014.

== Topography ==
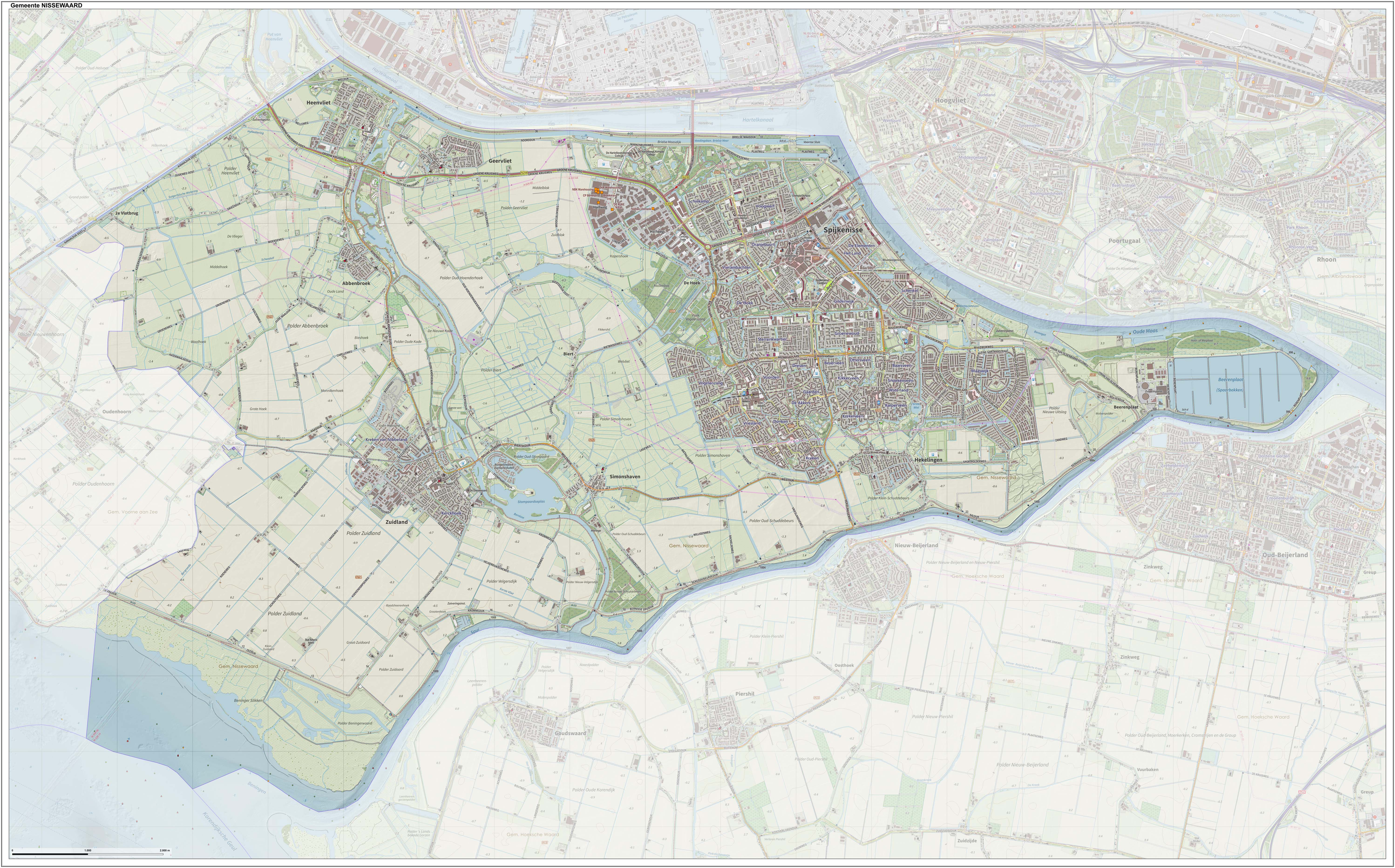

Topographic map of the municipality of Nissewaard, June 2015

== Notable people ==
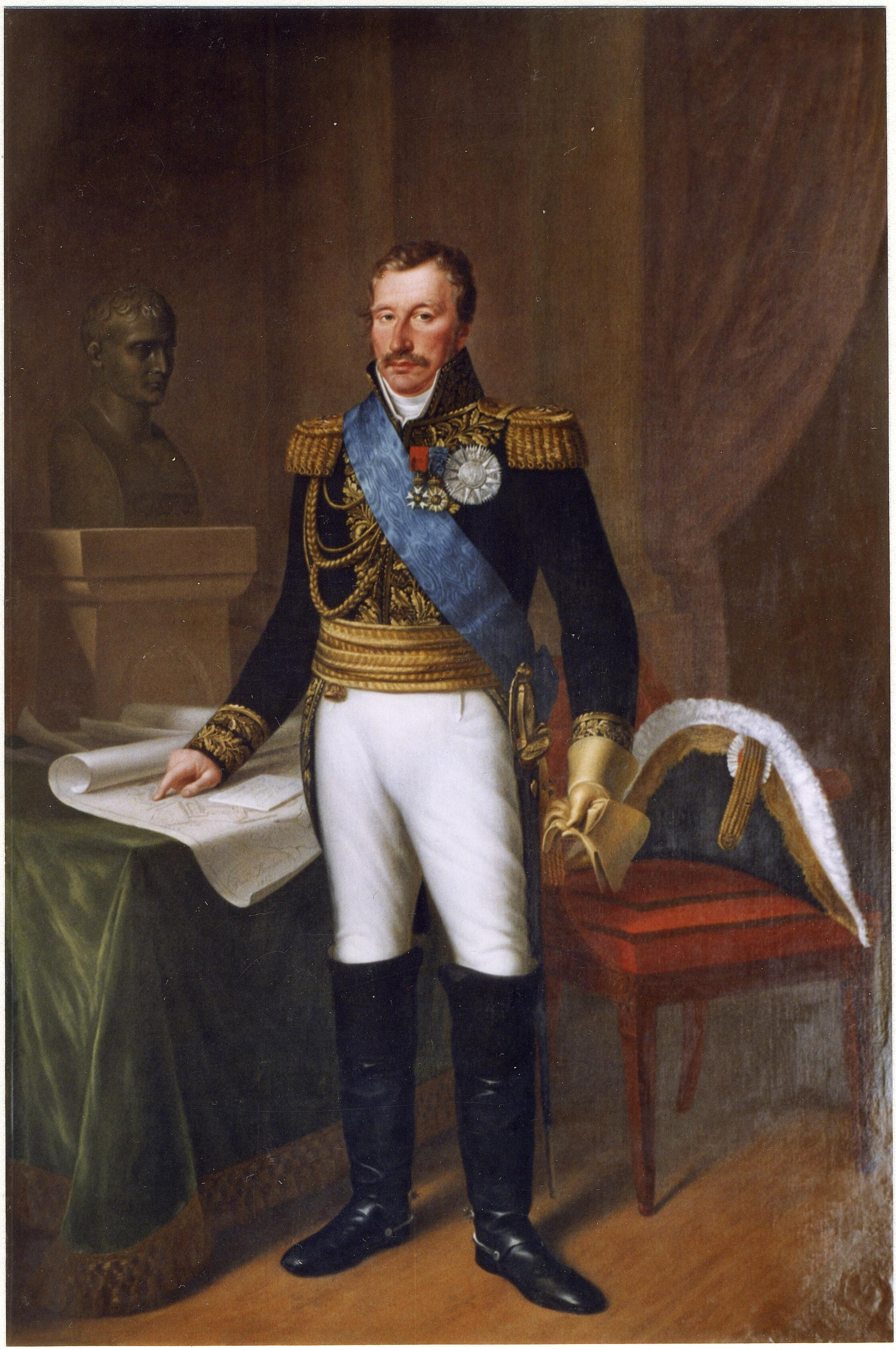
Dirk van Hogendorp, c. 1813

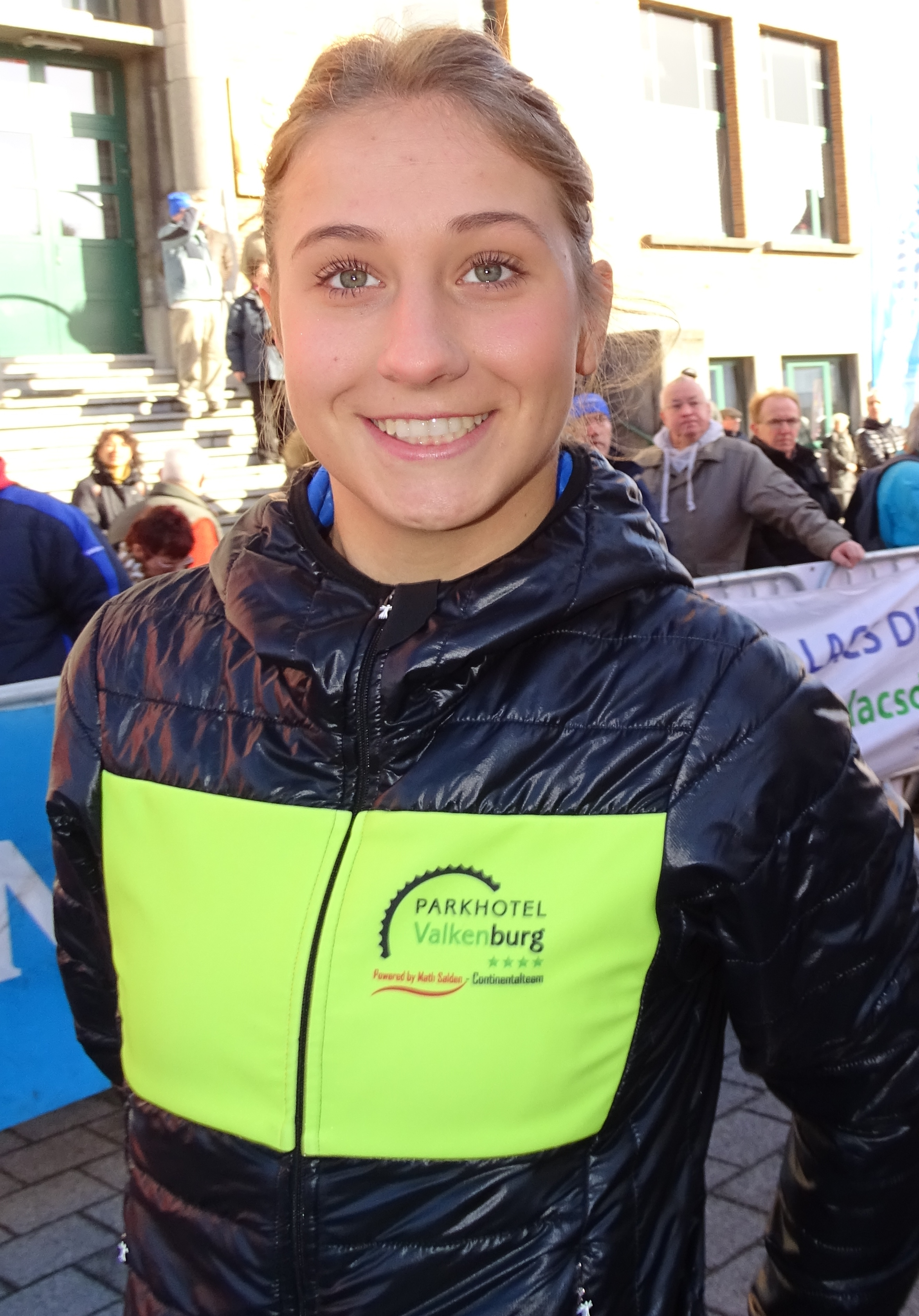
Chanella Stougje, 2016

- Dirk van Hogendorp (1761 in Heenvliet – 1822), Dutch officer and author
- Jan Campert (1902 in Spijkenisse – 1943) a journalist, theater critic and writer
- Marleen de Pater-van der Meer (1950 in Hekelingen – 2015) a Dutch politician
- Jan Bechtum (born 1958 in Spijkenisse) a Dutch guitarist
- Erik de Jong (born 1961 in Spijkenisse) known as Spinvis, a Dutch one-man music project
- Medy van der Laan (born 1968 in Spijkenisse) a retired Dutch politician
- Alexander van Oudenaarden (born 1970 in Zuidland) a Dutch biophysicist and systems biologist
- Sied van Riel (born 1978) a Dutch trance music DJ and producer, lives in Spijkenisse
- Björn Franken (born 1983 in Spijkenisse) known as Vato Gonzalez, DJ and producer
- Nick van de Wall (born 1987 in Spijkenisse) known as Afrojack, DJ and producer
- Duncan Laurence (born 1994 in Spijkenisse) singer, winner of the Eurovision Song Contest 2019

=== Sport ===
- Bram Groeneweg (1905 in Spijkenisse – 1988) a Dutch long-distance runner, competed in the marathon at the 1928 Summer Olympics
- Emiel Mellaard (born 1966 in Spijkenisse) is a retired Dutch long jump record holder
- Maarten den Bakker (born 1969 in Abbenbroek) a retired road bicycle racer, competed in the 1988 Summer Olympics
- Joeri de Groot (born 1977 in Spijkenisse) a Dutch rower, competed at the 2004 Summer Olympics
- Patrick van Luijk (born 1984 in Spijkenisse) a Dutch sprinter
- Martijn Barto (born 1984 in Spijkenisse) a Dutch professional footballer with over 200 club caps
- Chanella Stougje (born 1996 in Zuidland) a Dutch professional racing cyclist
