= Vedda language =

Endangered language of Sri Lanka

Vedda
- වැදි
- Pronunciation: [ʋæd̪ːə]
- Native to: Sri Lanka
- Region: Uva Province
- Ethnicity: 2,500 Vedda (2002)
- Native speakers: (undated figure of 300)
- Language family: either a language isolate or an Indo-Aryan language
- Writing system: Sinhalese script

Language codes
- ISO 639-3: ved
- Glottolog: vedd1240
- ELP: Veddah
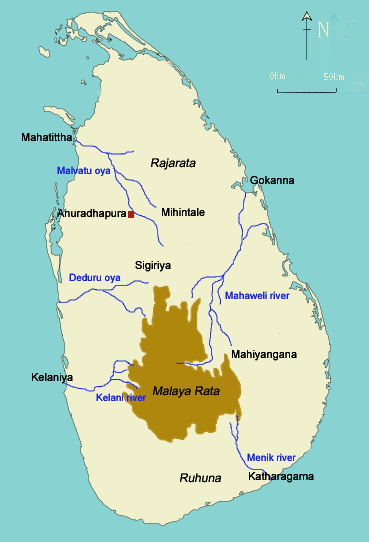
- The refuge of the Vedda language(s) in Malaya Rata or Central Highlands until the fall of Dry zone civilization starting in the 9th century, also the crucible of later Vedda Creole development from 10th to 12th century

- Vedda is classified as Definitely Endangered by the UNESCO Atlas of the World's Languages in Danger.

Vedda (Veddah: [ʋæd̪ːə]) is an endangered language that is used by the indigenous Vedda people of Sri Lanka. Additionally, communities such as Coast Veddas and Anuradhapura Veddas who do not strictly identify as Veddas also use words from the Vedda language in part for communication during hunting and/or for religious chants, throughout the island. According to Ethnologue, Vedda is an Indo-European language belonging to the Indo-Aryan branch, but some linguists consider it a language isolate that is not related to either Dravidian or Indo-European.

When a systematic field study was conducted in 1959, the language was confined to the older generation of Veddas from Dambana. In the 1990s, self-identifying Veddas knew few words and phrases in Vedda, but there were individuals who knew the language comprehensively. Initially there was considerable debate amongst linguists as to whether Vedda is a dialect of Sinhala or an independent language. Later studies indicate that the language spoken by today's Veddas is a creole which evolved from ancient times, when the Veddas came into contact with the early Tamil and Sinhala, from whom they increasingly borrowed words and synthetic features, yielding the cumulative effect that Vedda resembles Tamil and Sinhala in many particulars, but its grammatical core remains intact.

The parent Vedda language(s) is of unknown linguistic origins, while Sinhala is part of the Indo-Aryan branch of the Indo-European language family. Phonologically, Vedda is distinguished from Sinhala by the higher frequency of palatal sounds [c] and [ɟ]. The effect is also heightened by the addition of inanimate suffixes. Morphologically, the Vedda word classes are nouns, verbs and invariables, with unique gender distinctions in animate nouns. It has reduced and simplified many forms of Sinhala such as second person pronouns and denotations of negative meanings. Instead of borrowing new words from Sinhala or other languages, Vedda creates combinations of words from a limited lexical stock. Vedda maintains many archaic Sinhala terms from the 10th to 12th centuries, as a relict of its close contact with Sinhala, while retaining a number of unique words that cannot be derived from Sinhala. Vedda has exerted a substratum influence in the formation of Sinhala. This is evident by the presence of both lexical and structural elements in Sinhala which cannot be traced to either Indo-Aryan or neighboring Dravidian languages.

== History ==
It is unknown which languages were spoken in Sri Lanka before it was settled by Prakrit-speaking immigrants in the 5th century BCE. The term Vedda is a Dravidian word and stems from the Tamil word vēṭu meaning 'hunting', vēṭaṉ 'hunter'. Cognate terms (such as bēḍar, bēḍa "hunter" in Kannada, vyadh (व्यध्) in Sanskrit language) are used throughout South India to describe hunter-gatherers. Sri Lanka has had other hunter-gathering peoples such as the Rodiya and Kinnaraya.

The earliest account of Vedda was written by Ryklof Van Goens (1663–1675), who served as a Director General of the Dutch East India Company in Sri Lanka. He wrote that the Veddas' language was much closer to Sinhala than to Tamil. Robert Knox, an Englishman held captive by a Kandyan king, wrote in 1681 that the wild and settled Veddas spoke the language of the Sinhala people. The Portuguese friar Fernão de Queiroz, who wrote a nuanced description of Vedda in 1686, reported that the language was not mutually intelligible with other native languages. Robert Percival wrote in 1803 that the Veddas, although seemingly speaking a broken dialect of Sinhala, amongst themselves spoke a language that was known only to them. But John Davies in 1831 wrote that the Veddas spoke a language that was understood by the Sinhala except for a few words. These discrepancies in observations were clarified by Charles Pridham, who wrote in 1848 that the Veddas knew a form of Sinhala that they were able to use in talking to outsiders, but to themselves they spoke in a language that, although influenced by Sinhala and Tamil, was understood only by them.

The first systematic attempt at studying the Vedda language was undertaken by Hugh Neville, an English civil servant in British Ceylon. He founded The Taprobanian, a quarterly journal devoted to the study of everything Ceylonese. He speculated, based on etymological studies, that Vedda is based on an Old Sinhala form called Hela. His views were followed by Henry Parker, another English civil servant and the author of Ancient Ceylon (1909), who wrote that most Vedda words were borrowed from Sinhala, but he also noted words of unique origin, which he assigned to the original language of the Veddas. The second most important study was made in 1935 by Wilhem Geiger, who also sounded the alarm that Vedda would be soon extinct and needed to be studied in detail. One of the linguists to heed that call was Manniku W. Sugathapala De Silva who did a comprehensive study of the language in 1959 as a PhD thesis, which he published as a book: according to him, the language was restricted to the older generation of people from the Dambana region, with the younger generation shifting to Sinhala, whereas Coast Veddas were speaking a dialect of Sri Lankan Tamil that is used in the region. During religious festivals, people who enter a trance or spirit possession sometimes use a mixed language that contains words from Vedda. (Note: Vedars or Coast Veddas consider themselves and are considered by the Sri Lankan Tamils as a caste (kulam or jati in Tamil), rather than an ethnic group. Nevertheless there is considerable debate amongst Vedars and their Tamil neighbors to their status within the caste system, Vedars claiming very high status and their neighbors assigned somewhat lower status. Vedars use the Sri Lankan Tamil dialect peculiar to that region called Batticaloa Tamil dialect in their day to day conversations. Vedar children also study in that language in schools. But during religious (sadangu in Tamil) ceremonies, those who are possessed by spirits speak in a mixed language that they call Vedar Sinkalam ('Vedar Sinhala') or Vedar Bhasai ('Vedar language') which is the Vedda language of the interior Vedas. Vedar Sinkalam is mixed with many Tamil words, as people no longer know the language. At some point in the past that the people were bilingual in Vedda and Tamil, but that is no longer the case.) Veddas of the Anuradhapura region speak in Sinhala, but use Vedda words to denote animals during hunting trips. (Note: In the late 1800s, Veddas of Anuradhapura did not identify themselves as Veddas to Parker and other British ethnologists. They self identified themselves as Vanniyas or people of the forest. But to James Brow, an anthropologists who studied them in the 1970s, they readily identified themselves as Veddas. Parker recorded number of hunting terms used by the Vanniyas that were similar to what the Veddas of Bintanne region used.)

== Classification ==
=== Dialect, creole or independent language ===
The Vedda community or the indigenous population of Sri Lanka is said to have inhabited the island prior to the arrival of the Aryans in the 5th century BCE and after the collapse of the dry zone civilization in the 15th century, they have extended their settlements once more in the North Central, Uva and Eastern regions. However, with the entering of the colonization schemes to the island after the 19th century, the Vedda population has shrunk to the Vedi rata or Maha vedi rata. Subsequently, the Vedda language was subjected to hybridisation depending on the geographical locality of the community. For instance, the language of the Veddas living in the North Central and Uva regions was affected by Sinhala, while the language of the coastal Veddas in the East was influenced by the Tamil language. However, there are still many arguments regarding the origin of the Vedda language. Ariesen Ahubudu calls the Vedda language a "dialect of Sinhala", saying that it is a creole language variety derived from Sinhala. According to him, "Veddas belong to the post Vijayan period and they use a language which has its origins in the Sinhala language." He further explains this with an etymological explanation of the term vadi, that evolved from dava, meaning 'forest, timber'. This became davi, meaning 'those who live in the forest', which later transformed into vadi.

=== Creole based on Sinhala ===
The language contact that might have occurred between the Aryan immigrants and the aboriginal inhabitants could have led either to a language shift or to the crystallization of a new language through the creation of a pidgin. The first instance could have been in effect in relation to the members of the Vedda community who were absorbed into the new settlements, while in the second instance the occasional contact of the Veddas with the new settlers would have resulted in the crystallization of a new language instead of the original Vedda language. The term creole refers to a linguistic medium which has crystallized in a situation of language contact and the process of this crystallization begins as a pidgin. A pidgin becomes a creole when it is spoken natively by an entire speech community, whose ancestors have been geographically displaced through which a rupture is created in their relationship with their original language. Such situations were often the consequences of slavery and trade that occurred from the 17th to the 19th centuries owing to the process of colonization. As far as the Vedda community is concerned, although the features of a creole are visible in terms of phonology, morphology, syntax and lexicon, a number of distinctions have been identified between the Vedda language and the classic creolization which occurred during the colonial period. Here it is also important to acknowledge the existence of many issues in relation to the process of creolization that remain unresolved in the domain of linguistics. Therefore, the classification of the Vedda language either as a dialect or as a creole becomes a difficult task, although it is clear that in the current context the Vedda language is not an independent language of its own. However based on recent studies conducted on the Vedda community, it has been revealed that the Vedda language is on the verge of facing extinction since the younger generation is keen on using Sinhala or Tamil as their first language, being influenced by the dominant language of the region of residence due to an array of reasons including fragmentation of settlements, economic policies, national education structure and political factors of the country.

== Phonology ==
Vedda consonants
		Labial	Dental/ Alveolar	Retroflex	Palatal	Velar	Glottal
Nasal		m	n		ɲ	ŋ	
Plosive	voiceless	p	t	ʈ	c	k	
Plosive	voiced	b	d	ɖ	ɟ	ɡ	
Plosive	prenasalised	ᵐb	ⁿd	ᶯɖ	ᶮɟ	ᵑɡ	
Fricative			s		ʃ		h
Trill			r				
Approximant		ʋ	l		j		

Vedda vowels
	Front		Central	Back	
	short	long	Central	short	long
Close	i	iː		u	uː
Mid	e	eː	ə	o	oː
Open	æ	æː		a	aː

Although in phonemic inventory Vedda is very similar to Sinhala, in phonotactics it is very dissimilar to Sinhala. The usage of palatal plosives ([c] and [ɟ]) is very high in Vedda. Some comparisons:

English	Sinhala	Vedda
earlier	issara	iccara

This effect is heightened by the addition of inanimate suffixes such as -pojja, -gejja or -raacca. These suffixes are used in tandem with borrowings from Sinhala.

English	Sinhala	Vedda
weight	bara	barapojja
eye	asa	ajjejja
head	isa	ijjejja
water	watura/diya	diyaracca

These transformations are very similar to what is seen in other Creole languages like Melanesian Pidgin English and Jamaican English Creole. The preponderance of the palatal affricates is explained as a remainder from days when the original Vedda language may have had a high frequency of such phonemes.

== Grammar ==
In Sinhala, indicative sentences are negated by adding a negative particle to the emphatic form of the verb, whereas in Vedda, the negative particle is added to the infinitive. In Sinhala, all indicative sentences whether negative or affirmative, exhibit two tenses – past and non past, but in Vedda a three-term tense system is used in affirmative sentences, but not in negative. Sinhala pronouns have number distinction, but Vedda does not have number distinction. The Vedda verbal and nominal inflexions are similar to Sinhala but are not identical. Vedda also exhibits a gender classification in inanimate and animate nouns.

=== Morphology ===
Formerly distinct Vedda nouns have two types of suffixes, one for animate and another for inanimate.

=== Animate nouns ===
The animate suffixes are –atto for personal pronouns and –laatto for all other animate nouns and –pojja and –raaccaa for personified nouns. Examples are

- deyyalaatto ('god')
- pannilaatto ('worm')
- meeatto ('I' or 'we')
- irapojja ('sun')
- giniraaccaa ('fire')

These suffixes are also used in singular and plural forms based on the verbal and non-verbal context.

1. botakandaa nam puccakaduvaa huura meeatto ('Sir, I killed the elephant though')
2. meeattanne kiriamilaatto kalaapojjen mangaccana kota eeattanne badapojje kakulek randaala indatibaala tibenava ('When our great-grandmother was walking in the forest there was a child conceived in that one's womb.')

The dependence on verbal (and non-verbal) context for semantic specification, which is accomplished by inflectional devices by natural languages is an indication of a contact language.

Certain words that appear to be from original Vedda language do not have these suffixes; also, animate nouns also have gender distinctions, with small animals treated as feminine (i marker) and larger ones masculine (a marker).

- botakanda ('elephant')
- kankunaa ('deer')
- kariya ('bear')
- hatera ('bear’)
- okma ('buffalo')
- kandaarni ('bee')
- mundi ('monitor lizard')
- potti ('bee')
- makini ('spider')
- ikini ('louse')

=== Inanimate nouns ===
Inanimate nouns use suffixes such as –rukula and –danda with nouns denoting body parts and other suffixes such as -pojja, -tana, and -gejja. Suffixes are used when the words are borrowed from Sinhala.

- ayrukula ('eye')
- ugurudanda ('throat')
- veedipojja ('street')
- kirigejja ('coconut')
- kavitana ('verse')
- giniracca ('fire')

There are number of forms that are from the original Vedda language that lack suffixes such as

- galrakki ('axe')
- caalava ('pot')
- bucca ('bush')

Vedda inanimate nouns are formed by borrowing Sinhala adjectives and adding a suffix. Kavi is the Sinhala adjective for the noun Kaviya, whereas the Vedda noun is kavi-tana, where tana is a suffix.

=== Pronouns ===
Examples of pronouns are meeatto ('I'), topan ('you'), eyaba ('there'), koyba ('where?'). Compared to Sinhala, which requires five forms to address people based on status, Vedda uses one (topan) irrespective of status. These pronouns are also used in both singular and plural denotations.

Sinhala singular	Sinhala plural	Vedda singular/plural
obavahanse	obavahanselaa	topan
ohe	ohelaa	topan
tamuse	tamuselaa	topan
oya	oyalaa	topan
umba	umbala	topan
tho	thopi	topan

=== Numerals ===
These are found in definite and indefinite forms, for example ekama 'one' (def.) and ekamak 'once' (indef.) They count ekamay, dekamay and tunamay. Vedda also reduces the number formations found in Sinhala.

English	Sinhala	Vedda
two persons	dennek	dekamak
two things	dekak	dekamak
twice	deparak	dekamak

=== Negation ===
Another example of simplification in Vedda is the minimisation of negative meanings found in Sinhala:

English	Sinhala	Vedda
no	naa	koduy
don't	epaa	koduy
can't	baa	koduy
not	nemee	koduy
if not	nattaN	koduy
unable	bari	koduy

== Lexicon ==
Many Vedda words are directly borrowed from Sinhala or Tamil via Sinhala while maintaining words that are not derivable from Sinhala or its cognate languages from the Indo-Aryan language group. Vedda also exhibits a propensity for paraphrases and it coins words from its limited lexical stock rather than borrowing words from other languages including Sinhala. For example:

Sinhala	Vedda	English
nava	maadiyanganalle dandDukacca ('vehicle of the ocean')	ship
vassa	uDatanin mandovena diyaracca ('water falling from above')	rain
tuvakkuva (loan from Turkish tüfek, 'rifle')	puccakazDana yamake ('shooting thing')	gun
upadinava	baDapojjen mangaccanvaa ('to come from the belly')	to be born
padura	vaterena yamake ('sleeping thing')	bed
pansala (loan from English)	kurukurugaccana ulpojja ('spike making a "kuru-kuru" sound')	pencil

=== Archaic terms ===
Vedda maintains in its lexicon archaic Sinhala words that are no longer in daily usage. These archaic words are attested from classical Sinhala prose from the 10th century until the 13th century, the purported period of close contact between the original Vedda language(s) and Old Sinhala leading to the development of the creole. Some examples are:

- devla in Vedda means 'sky', but in a 10th-century Sinhala exegetical work called Dhampia Atuva Getapadaya, it is used in the meaning of 'cloud'.
- diyamaccca in Vedda meaning 'fish' is similar to diyamas found in a 10th-century monastic work called Sikhavalanda.
- manda in Vedda means 'near' or 'with'. This word is attested in the 12th-century eulogy called Butsarana.
- koomantana meaning 'wearing apparel' is similar to the Sinhala word konama found in the 13th century work Ummagga Jatakaya; alternatively komanam in Tamil is a 'loincloth', a cloth worn by early Veddas.

According to research at the turn of the 20th century by British anthropologists Charles and Brenda Seligman, the use of archaic Sinhala words in Vedda may have arisen from the need to communicate freely in the presence of Sinhala speakers without being understood. They claimed that this need encouraged the development of a code internal to the Vedda language that included archaic Sinhala words (as well as mispronounced and invented words) in order to intentionally obfuscate meaning.

== Substratum influence in Sinhala ==
According to Geiger and Gair, Sinhala has features that set it apart from other Indo-Aryan languages. Some of the differences can be explained by the substrate influence of parent stock of the Vedda language. Sinhala has many words that are only found in Sinhala or it is shared between Sinhala and Vedda and cannot be etymologically derived from Middle or Old Indo-Aryan. Common examples are kola in Sinhala and Vedda for 'leaf' (although others suggest a Dravidian origin for this word.), dola in Sinhala for 'pig' and 'offering' in Vedda. Other common words are rera for 'wild duck' and gala for 'stones' in toponyms found throughout the island (although others have also suggested a Dravidian origin). There are also high frequency words denoting body parts in Sinhala such as oluva for 'head', kakula for 'leg', bella for 'neck' and kalava for 'thighs' that are derived from pre-Sinhala languages of Sri Lanka. The oldest Sinhala grammar, Sidatsangarava, written in the 13th century, recognized a category of words that exclusively belonged to early Sinhala. It lists naramba ('to see') and kolamba ('ford' or 'harbour') as belonging to an indigenous source. Kolamba is the source of the name of the commercial capital Colombo.

== See also ==
- Vedda
- Balangoda Man
- Fa Hien Cave
- Indo-Portuguese creole
- Ceylon Portuguese creole
- Lists of endangered languages
- List of endangered languages in Asia

== Cited literature ==
- Boyle, Richard (2004). Knox's Words: A Study of the Words of Sri Lankan Origin Or Association First Used in English Literature by Robert Knox and Recorded in the Oxford English Dictionary. Visidunu Publication. ISBN 9789559170679.
- De Silva, Premakumara; Punchihewa, Asitha (August 2011). "Socio- Anthropological Research Project on Vedda Community in Sri Lanka".
- Holm, John A. (2000). An introduction to pidgin and creoles. Cambridge, UK: Cambridge University Press. ISBN 978-0511039850. OCLC 56409399.
- Indrapala, Karthigesu (2007). The evolution of an ethnic identity: The Tamils in Sri Lanka C. 300 BCE to C. 1200 CE. Colombo: Vijitha Yapa. ISBN 978-955-1266-72-1.
- International Labour Office (1953). Indigenous peoples: living and working conditions of aboriginal populations. Geneva: International Labour Office. LCCN l54000004.
- Dharmadasa, K.N.O (February 1974). "The Creolization of an Aboriginal language:The case of Vedda in Sri Lanka (Ceylon)". Anthropological Linguistics. 16 (2). Indiana University: 79–106. ISSN 0003-5483. JSTOR 30029514.
- Samarasinghe, S. W. R. de A (1990). The Vanishing aborigines : Sri Lanka's Veddas in transition. International Centre for Ethnic Studies in association with NORAD and Vikas Pub. House. ISBN 978-0-7069-5298-8.
- Gair, James (1998). Studies in South Asian Linguistics. New York: Oxford University Press. ISBN 978-0-19-509521-0.
- Van Driem, George (Jan 15, 2002). Languages of the Himalayas: An Ethnolinguistic Handbook of the Greater Himalayan Region. Brill Academic Publishers. ISBN 978-90-04-10390-0.
- Blundell, David (2006). "Revisiting cultural heritage in Sri Lanka: The Vedda (Vanniyaletto)". Bulletin of the Indo-Pacific Prehistory Association. 26. Australian National University: 163–167. doi:10.7152/bippa.v26i0.12006.
- Seligman, C.G.; Seligman, B.Z. (1911). The Veddas. Cambridge University Press.
