= Dambana, Sri Lanka =

Village in North Central Province, Sri Lanka

Dambana (Sinhala: දඹාන) is a village within the Badulla District in Uva Province, Sri Lanka. It is closest to the town of Mahiyangana. It is known as the refuge of the indigenous Vedda people as well as their moribund Vedda language. It is well known for its eco-tourism projects, operated by Eco Team. In 2010 it had population of about 1000 individuals all belonging to Vedda families.

== See also ==
- Mawaragala Aranya Senasanaya
- Coast Veddas
- Anuradhapura Veddas
