= Aprusia veddah =

Scientific classification
- Kingdom: Animalia
- Phylum: Arthropoda
- Subphylum: Chelicerata
- Class: Arachnida
- Order: Araneae
- Infraorder: Araneomorphae
- Family: Oonopidae
- Genus: Aprusia
- Species: A. veddah

Binomial name
- Aprusia veddah Grismado & Deeleman, 2011

Species of spider

Aprusia veddah, is a species of oonopid spider of the genus Aprusia. It is endemic to Sri Lanka.

== Etymology ==
The specific name comes from the Vedda people, who are the indigenous people of Sri Lanka.

== Description ==
Aprusia veddah is only known from the female of the species. The females are 18.5mm long. The cephalothorax is pale orange and broadly oval in shape. The anterior lateral eyes are the largest and circular, the posterior median eyes are oval, as are the posterior lateral eyes; the posterior eye row is procurved from the front; the anterior lateral eyes are separated by less than their radius, the anterior lateral eye and the posterior lateral eye are separated by less than the anterior lateral eye's radius, the posterior median eyes are touching, the posterior lateral eye and posterior median eye are touching. The sternum is longer than wide. They have three spines on the prolateral side of the first femur.

The abdomen has dorsal scuta that are weakly sclerotized, pale orange and without a colour pattern. They cover around half of the abdomen. The epigastric scutum is weakly sclerotized, surrounding the pedicel, not protruding, small lateral sclerites absent. The postepigastric scutum is weakly sclerotized, pale orange, short, almost rectangular, only around the epigastric furrow, not fused to the epigastric scutum, the anterior margin is unmodified. The abdominal dorsal scutum is relatively long. The anterior receptacle and the lateral apodemes in the internal genitalia are also relatively long and thin.
