= Gonagolla Vihara =

Ancient temple/archaeological site in Sri Lanka

- ගොනාගොල්ල විහාරය
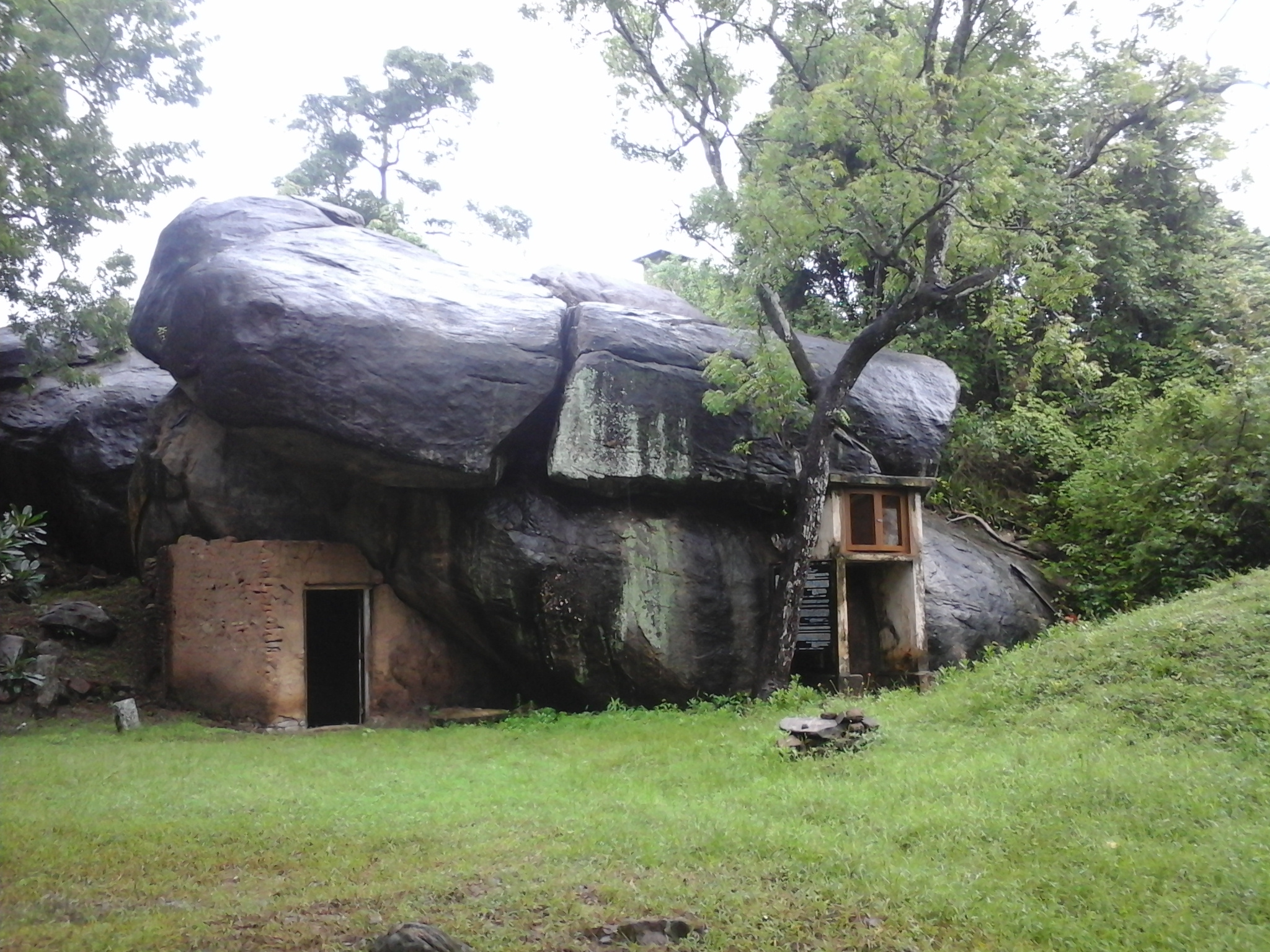
- A drip ledged cave with frescoes chamber at right side

Religion
- Affiliation: Buddhism
- District: Ampara
- Province: Eastern Province, Sri Lanka

Location
- Location: Gonagolla, Ampara, Sri Lanka
- Interactive map of Gonagolla Vihara
- Coordinates: 07°24′55.9″N 81°39′20.6″E

Architecture
- Type: Buddhist Temple
- Style: Cave temple
- Archaeological Protected Monument of Sri Lanka
- Designated: 10 October 2014

Gonagolla Vihara (Sinhalaː ගොනාගොල්ල විහාරය) is an ancient cave temple situated in Ampara District, Sri Lanka. The vihara is also known as Punchi Seegiriya (Little Sigiriya) by the locals since the temple contains ancient frescoes similar to those in Sigiriya. The site is in Kotmale Canal Settlement in Wewagampattuwa Division and lies about 4.8 km (3.0 mi) east of Kohombana Junction on Ampara – Gonagolla Road. The temple has been formally recognised by the government as an archaeological site in Sri Lanka. The designation was declared on 10 October 2014 under the government Gazette number 1884.

== History ==
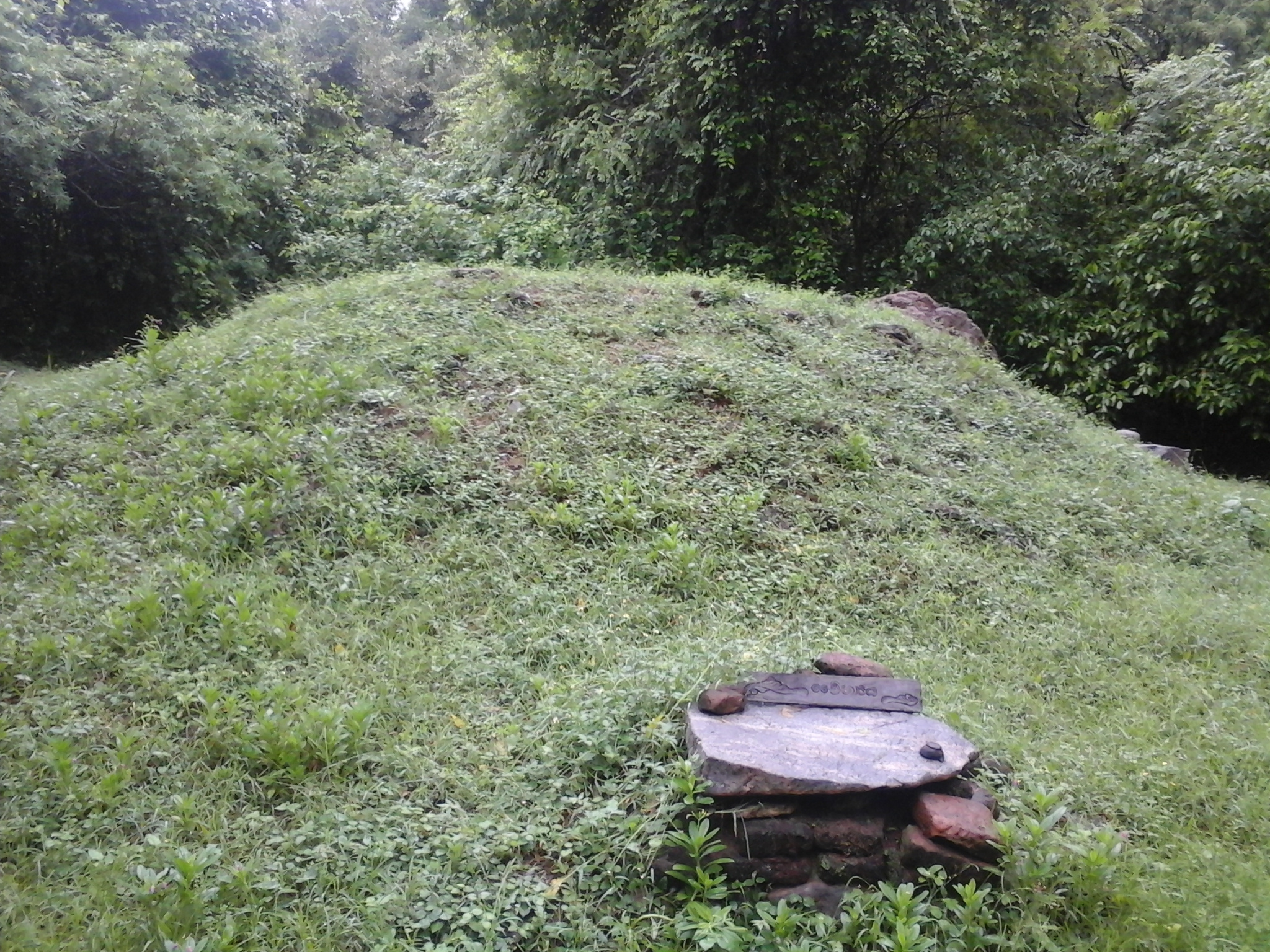
The ruined Stupa

There is clear evidence that the rock caves of the temple were occupied by ancient Vedda people as their paintings can be found nearby in the rock caves. Two more caves in the Vihara premises contains Brahmi rock inscriptions dating back to 3-5th centuries.

The remains of two ancient ponds, and the Stupa of Anuradhapura era, next to the frescoes cave, are examples of some constructions in the Vihara belong to the third century BC. Among other ruins a Vatadage, Chatra stones, remains of large scale buildings with carved stone pillars and rock stairways can be seen around the vihara premises.

== Frescoes ==
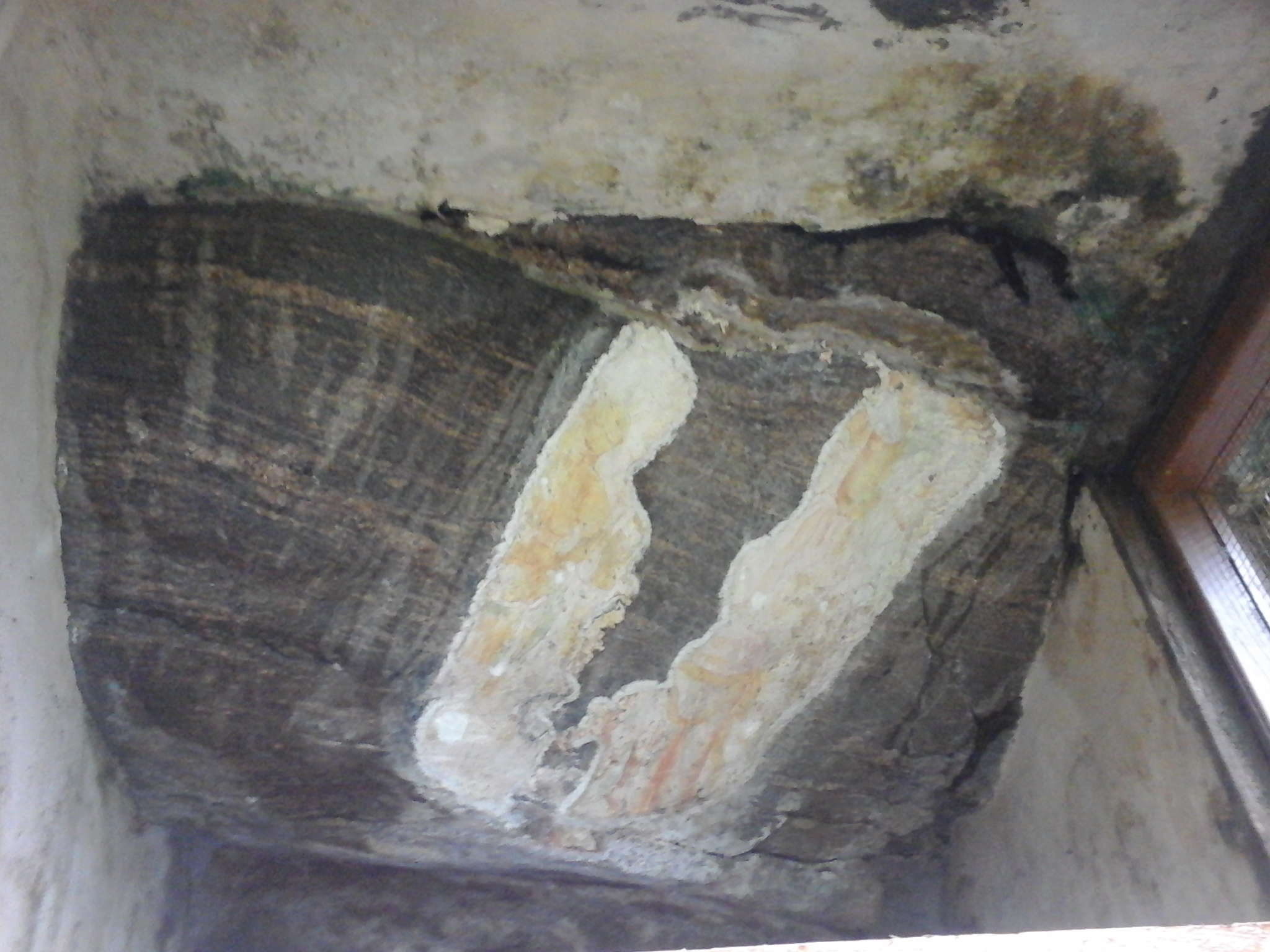
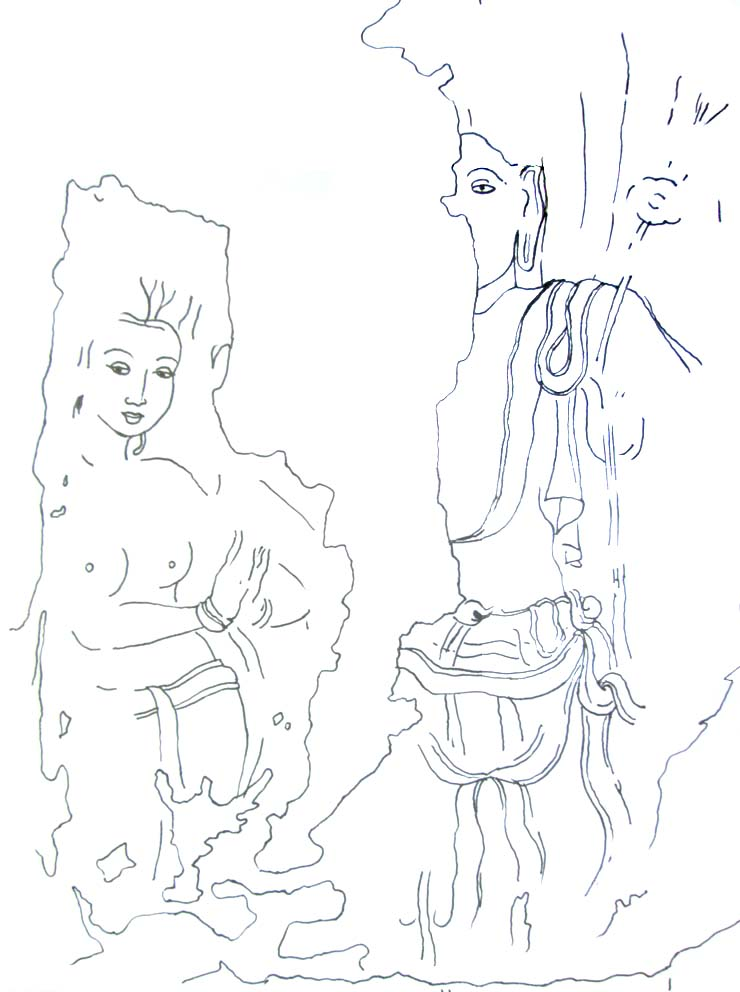
The remains of frescoes belong to 3rd century AD

In 1956 the Archaeological Department found out some remnants of frescoes belong to the 3rd century AD on the vaulted ceiling of a cave in Gonagolla temple. The frescoes have been drawn on a special plastered surface and depict a scene of a young female dancer and a man who is alleged to be a Bodhisattva. The female figure is almost identical to famous Sigiriya maidens (5th century) and both figures have been painted using red, yellow, green and white colors with sharp margins. Due to the frescoes, this temple is called Punchi Sigiriya (Little Sigiriya) by locals. There are also some pre-historic paintings drawn by Vedda people in a few rock caves of the temple premises.

== Vihara inscriptions ==
=== Rock inscriptions set 1 ===
Period: 3rd-4th century AD, Script: Later Brahmi, Language: Old Sinhala
Content (1): "A donation had been made by the wife of district governor Mahinda and the wife of district governor Bakadaya to the Vihara"
Content (2): "A donation of robes for the monks of the Alithaka maha vihara for the rainy season by a person by a person named Ahaya of Maharata"
Content (3): "A donation of money (Kahavanu) by a person to the Alithaka maha vihara for the maintenance of the Ariyavasa ceremony"

=== Rock inscriptions set 2 ===
Period: 4th-5th century AD, Script: Transitional Brahmi, Language: Old Sinhala
Content (1): "A donation made to the community of monks of the monastery"
Content (2): "A flight of steps was constructed by Nadasaba of Gotigama. The merit thus acquired is offered to all beings"

== Notes ==
- "PART I : SECTION (I) — GENERAL Government Notifications" (PDF). The Gazette of the Democratic Socialist Republic of Sri Lanka. 1884. 10 October 2014. Archived from the original (PDF) on 2019-06-22.
