= Kinnaraya =

Kinnaraya or Kinnarayo also Kinnara are a social group or a caste among the Sinhalese of Sri Lanka. Similar to the Paraiyar of the Tamil Nadu state in South India.

== Origins ==
As the mainstream Sinhalese speakers claim North Indian ethnic origins, the presence of many South Indian-type social groups like the Kinnaraya indicate a complex migration history from India to Sri Lanka. But Kinnaraya do indicate vestiges of tribal origins like the other formerly untouchable caste Rodiyas. Some anthropologists believe that the early society of Sri Lanka looked to South India for manpower to fulfill functional needs as land was cleared and new villages founded. The indigenous people of Sri Lanka known in the legends as Yakkas and Nagas also fused with the caste structure at the bottom as marginal people providing needed support services for survival as their habitats were cleared or simply taken over. Unlike other Sinhalese castes there is anecdotal evidence that along with Rodiyas, the Kinnarays were an indigenous tribal group that eventually became a Dalit-like caste.

== Etymology ==
The origin of the word Kinnara is complex and number of theories have been proposed. But it is not clear how this early Vedic or Proto-Dravidian word or a word similar to it came to describe this small social group. Most Hindu and Buddhist literature have differing meanings for this word.

== Status ==
As a numerically small and culturally insignificant community they have not been able to upgrade their social position in the society. Many live as agricultural or domestic workers, overseas maids in the Middle East, or especially since the Black July civil war pogroms as recruits in the army.

== Sub divisions ==
There used to be many clan-like subdivisions within the caste that are not attested in the known literature.

== Religion ==
Although many Kinnaraya purport to adhere to the conservative Theravada Buddhism there is a widespread belief in Demons, Spirits, Hindu deities and practice of related rituals such as spirit possession and cursing rituals. The Kinnaraya community is particularly known for its performances of the comic opera Sokari performed on the Kamatha threshing floor in honor of the goddess Pattini and the god Kataragama.

== See also ==
- Kinnara kingdom
- History of Sri Lanka
