= Wanniyala hakgala =

Scientific classification
- Kingdom: Animalia
- Phylum: Arthropoda
- Subphylum: Chelicerata
- Class: Arachnida
- Order: Araneae
- Infraorder: Araneomorphae
- Family: Pholcidae
- Genus: Wanniyala
- Species: W. hakgala

Binomial name
- Wanniyala hakgala Huber & Benjamin, 2005

Species of spider

Wanniyala hakgala is a species of spider of the genus Wanniyala. It is endemic to Sri Lanka. The species were first named with a male found from Hakgala area, hence the specific name.

== Description ==
Male species are differentiated by its counterpart species Wanniyala agrabopath by epigynum with pointed projection, ochre-yellow carapace with wide blackish median band with lateral dark margins. Opisthosoma grey with black pattern dorsally and dark patterns ventrally as well. Sternum is light brown in color, while legs are pale ochre-yellow. Females are similar to males, but with an unmodified clypeus.

== Distribution ==
Exclusively endemic to central hills of Sri Lanka, the species are found only from three localities around Nuwara Eliya district and Kandy district. The type locality is from Hakgala, and the two other sites are from Kumbukana and Nonawatte wet slope.

== See also ==
- List of Pholcidae species
