= Aprusia kataragama =

Scientific classification
- Kingdom: Animalia
- Phylum: Arthropoda
- Subphylum: Chelicerata
- Class: Arachnida
- Order: Araneae
- Infraorder: Araneomorphae
- Family: Oonopidae
- Genus: Aprusia
- Species: A. kataragama

Binomial name
- Aprusia kataragama Grismado & Deeleman, 2011

Species of spider

Aprusia kataragama is a species of spider of the genus Aprusia. It is endemic to Sri Lanka.
