= Mawaragala Aranya Senasanaya =

Buddhist temple in Sri Lanka

Mawaragala Forest Hermitage
- මාවරගල ආරණ්‍ය සේනාසනය
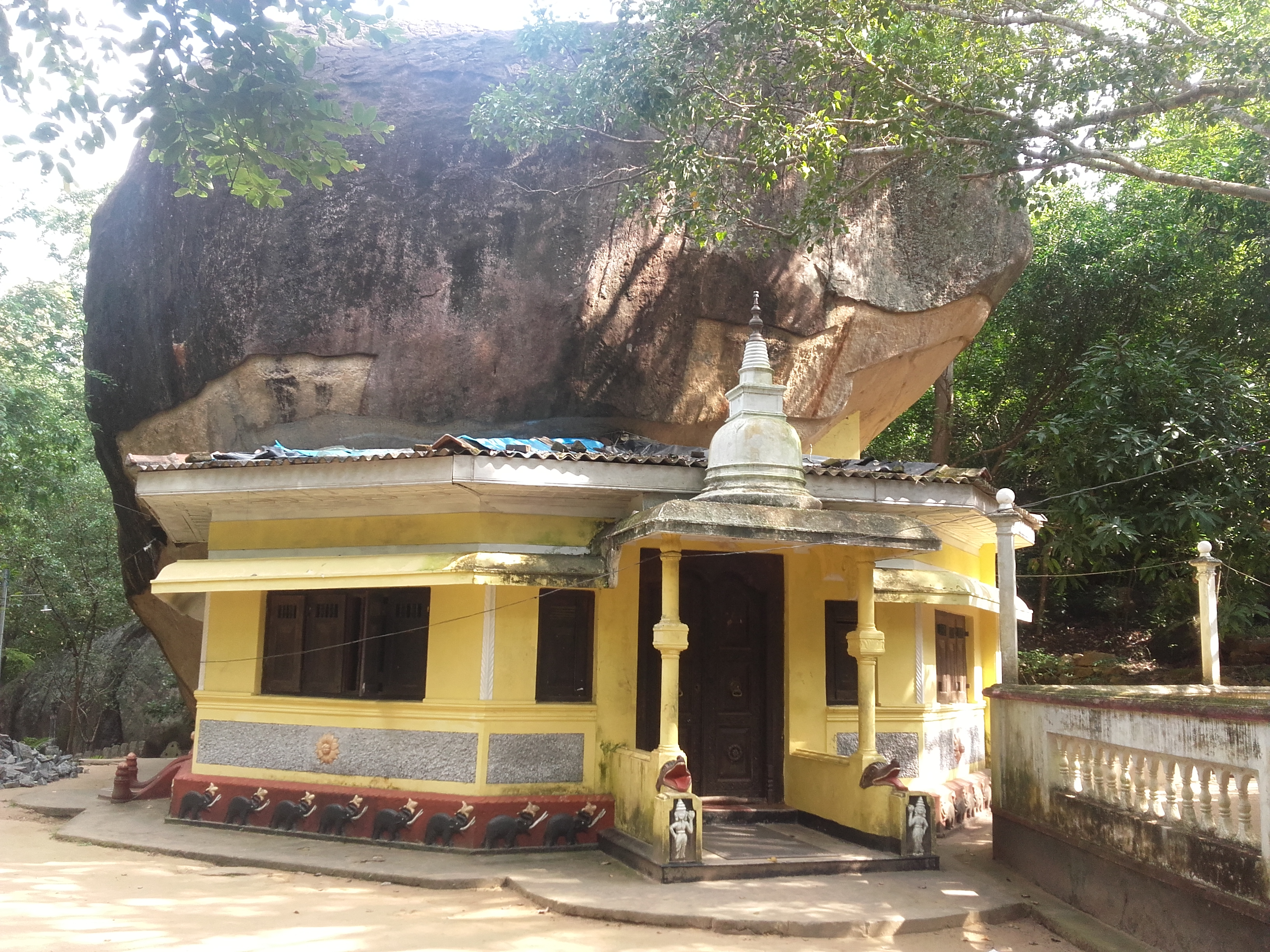

Religion
- Affiliation: Buddhism
- District: Badulla
- Province: Uva Province

Location
- Location: Dambana, Mahiyangana, Sri Lanka
- Interactive map of Mawaragala Forest Hermitage
- Coordinates: 07°23′53.5″N 81°05′47.6″E

Architecture
- Type: Buddhist Temple
- Style: Cave temple

Mawaragala Aranya Senasanaya or Mawaragala Forest Hermitage (Sinhalaː මාවරගල ආරණ්‍ය සේනාසනය) is an ancient Buddhist temple in Mahiyangana, Sri Lanka. Situated in Dambana, the temple is located about 15 km (9.3 mi) away from the ancient temple Mahiyangana Raja Maha Vihara. The temple has been declared as one of archaeological sites in Sri Lanka.

== History ==
It is believed that the history of Mawaragala Forest Hermitage dates back to the reign of King Valagamba (103 BC and c. 89–77 BC) and arhat Maliyadeva. Sixty Buddhist monks lived there during that time. Cave inscriptions written in early Brahmi script and Old Sinhala Prakrit have been found at this site.
