= Coast Veddas =

Social group within the minority Sri Lankan Tamil ethnic group

Coast Vedda
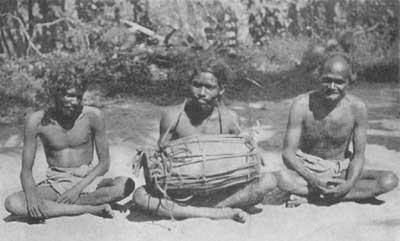
- Team of Vedars preparing for the Sadangu ceremony in Vaharai in 1900s

Total population
- ca. 8,000 (1983)

Regions with significant populations
- Eastern Province, Sri Lanka

Languages
- Sri Lankan Tamil; Vedda language also used for religious purposes

Related ethnic groups
- Other Veddas, other Sri Lankan Tamils

The Coast Veddas (Tamil: கரையோர வேடர்கள், romanized: Karaiyōra Vēṭarkaḷ, Sinhala: වෙරළේ වැද්දන්, romanized: Veraḷē Væddan), by self-designation, form a social group within the minority Sri Lankan Tamil ethnic group of the Eastern province of Sri Lanka. They are primarily found in small coastal villages from the eastern township of Trincomalee to Batticalao. Nevertheless, they also inhabit a few villages south of Batticalao as well. They make a living by fishing, slash and burn agriculture, paddy cultivation of rice, basket weaving for market and occasional wage labor. Anthropologists consider them to be partly descended from the indigenous Vedda people, as well as local Tamils. Residents of the Eastern province consider their Vedar (Tamil for "hunter") neighbors to have been part of the local social structure from earliest times, whereas some Vedar elders believe that their ancestors may have migrated from the interior at some time in the past.

They speak a dialect of Sri Lankan Tamil that is used in the region. During religious festivals, people who enter a trance or spirit possession sometimes use a mixed language that contains words from the Vedda language. Most Vedar are Hindu Saivites and worship a plethora of folk deities, as well as the main Hindu deities such as Murugan, Pillaiyar and Amman. They also maintain the ancestor worship tradition of the interior Veddas. Clan divisions, if they still exist, do not play an important role in choosing of marriage partners or place of domicile. Most identify themselves as a caste among the Tamils as opposed to a separate ethnic group. Their economic conditions have been impacted by the Sri Lankan civil war.

== Identity ==
Western observers such as James Emerson Tennent (1858) and Charles Gabriel Seligman (1911) have termed the social group Coast Veddahs, Coast Verdas or East Coast Veddas. Anthropologists have considered them to be at least partly descended from the Veddas of the interior of the island who had migrated at some unknown period in the past to the east coast, intermarrying with the local Tamils. Interior Veddas clans themselves have a number of divisions, each claiming either Sinhalese, Tamil, mixed, or pure Vedda lineages. Vedda identity also depends on whether these clans are hunter-gatherers or settled agriculturalists. Settled Veddas have tended over a period of time to assume Sinhalese or Tamil identity based on the area of residence. If considered a subdivision of Veddas, then they are by far the largest sub-group amongst the Vedda people. Residents of Eastern Province consider those who maintain a primitive life style, or are partly dependent on hunting and gathering, as Vedar without any connotations of ethnic origins.

Vedar are not designated as an indigenous community of Sri Lanka. They are placed within the Sri Lankan caste system. Vedar sometimes refer to themselves as "Veda Vellalar", thus claiming a high caste ranking (the Vellalar are given the highest ritual position within the caste structure of Sri Lankan Tamils in many regions). They also claim to marry into the higher castes of the neighboring region, such as Karaiyar. But some higher ranked castes did not consider Vedar quite their equals, although still placing them above the lower castes. Members of the Karaiyar caste sometimes downplayed their connections to Vedar as there was stigma attached to such unions. Field studies have indicated that mixed marriages across all caste groups of the eastern littoral was possible with Vedar. Vedar themselves claimed that they would not marry into lower Tamil castes such as Ambattar (barbers), Vannar (washerman) and Pallar (agricultural workers), but field studies indicated that such unions did sometimes take place.

Once a non-Vedar married into a Vedar family, he or she was assimilated as part of the Vedar village. Almost all Vedar families had an ancestor who was Tamil or a family member who was married to a Tamil from a neighboring village.

Some Vedar have gradually lost most aspects of their aboriginal identity and culture and no longer identify themselves as Vedar. During the 1980s and 1990s, most Vedar families were displaced from their native villages due to the effects of the Sri Lankan civil war and were placed in refugee camps along with other Tamil refugees.

== History ==
Ancestors of Vedar migrated to Sri Lanka via the Indian sub continent during the pre-historic period. A number of Mesolithic sites have been excavated containing human remains dated to 35,000 BCE. Anthropologists consider these skeletal remains to belong to a group ancestral to some of the surviving Vedar groups. Sri Lanka has also yielded Megalithic burial sites, one of which was excavated close to a present Vedar settlement, Kathiraveli. The precise time in which some of the Vedar lineage founders migrated to the east coast of Sri Lanka is unknown. The earliest written reference to Vedar is a Tamil chronicle, Nadukadu paraveni kalvettu, which is maintained amongst the custodians of a prominent Hindu temple in the town of Tirukovil in the Ampara District. It is a Tamil 14th to 16th-century original text. The chronicle documents the presence of a people who practiced hunting and gathering for survival, exercising jurisdiction over vast jungle tracts close to the Akkaraipattu township. It names a number of Vedar chiefs, such as Kadariyan and Puliyan. These Vedars were not just hunter-gatherers, but were also accepted as the rightful owners of the forest lands.

Emerson (1858) documented the presence of Vedar north of Eravur who subsisted by fishing or helping the traditional fisherfolk, as well by cutting wood for Muslim traders. He speculated that there were then at least 400 to 500 individuals in the group. He also recorded that it was the British colonial officers, as well as Wesleyan missionaries who provided land for them to start cultivating yams and other vegetables.

Neville (1890) and Seligman (1911) also documented the presence of a subdivision of Vedar called Kovil Vanam ("Temple precincts" in Tamil) within the southern edges of the Batticalo District; their name suggests they had originally lived in the jungles close to the Kataragama temple in the Hambantota District in the Southern Province. By the early 1900s these Vedar had mingled with the local Tamils and Sinhalese and were not encountered as a separate group any more. Local legends attribute the origins of some Hindu temples in the eastern province to the presence of Vedar. Important Hindu temples in villages such as Kokkadichcholai and Mandur have such Vedar creation legends. But Vedar are no longer associated with either the ownership or maintenance of these regionally important temples.

== Culture ==
=== Clans and family organization ===
Clans of the interior Veddas

Interior Veddas have clans called Waruge or Variga that were named after trees, animals or places of origin. Seligman speculated that these clans were territorial, thus hunting territory was divided amongst the clan, not to be violated by members of other clans. These clans were:

1. Morana (after Mora tree)
2. Unapana (Water)
3. Namudana (Namuda tree)
4. Ura (Wild boar)
5. Ambilo (Ant)
6. Tala (Plains)
7. Rugam (Village name)
8. Kovil Vannam (Temple precincts)

Among these, the Morana and Unapana clans claimed superior status to Namudana, Ambilo and Ura clans. Seligman reported that Morana and Unapana clans considered the other three as their servile groups, a classification strongly denied by the others. This also led to so-called servile groups denying such clan association when questioned and claiming Morana or Unapana clan origins.

Retention of Clan system amongst Vedar

When Seligman inquired about the Waruge divisions of the Vedar, most of them did not remember their clan origins. Of those who remembered, most self-identified as Ura Waruge. Others mentioned clans such as Ogatam, Kavatam, Umatam, Aembalaneduwe and Aembale. They also had memories of other clans such as Morana and Unapana. By the 1980s the Vedar had no knowledge of any word Waruge, although they vaguely used the Tamil term Vamisam (family origin) to indicate some division amongst them. Some had come up with a two-fold division of the Vedars based on the Kuti or matrilineal descent system popular in the East coast. These Kutis were supposed to have descended from former local chiefs called Vanniyar, who had ruled feudal divisions called Vannimai. But these clan divisions and related rules of endogamy were not totally followed by all Vedar, and there no practical prohibitions from marrying from each Kuti.

As with local Tamils, the preferred marriage pattern is based on cross cousin preference. Parallel cousins are considered brothers and sisters and are ineligible as partners. As most marriages take place between first and second cousins, clan endogamy even it is present is of no value. Within a village, most of the residents are related and this carries on over to villages that are three to five miles away as well. The longer the distance the more distantly are the villagers related to each other. Related lineages also maintain places of worship that are the private property of the family group.

=== Religion ===
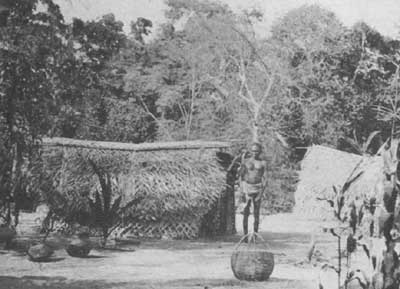
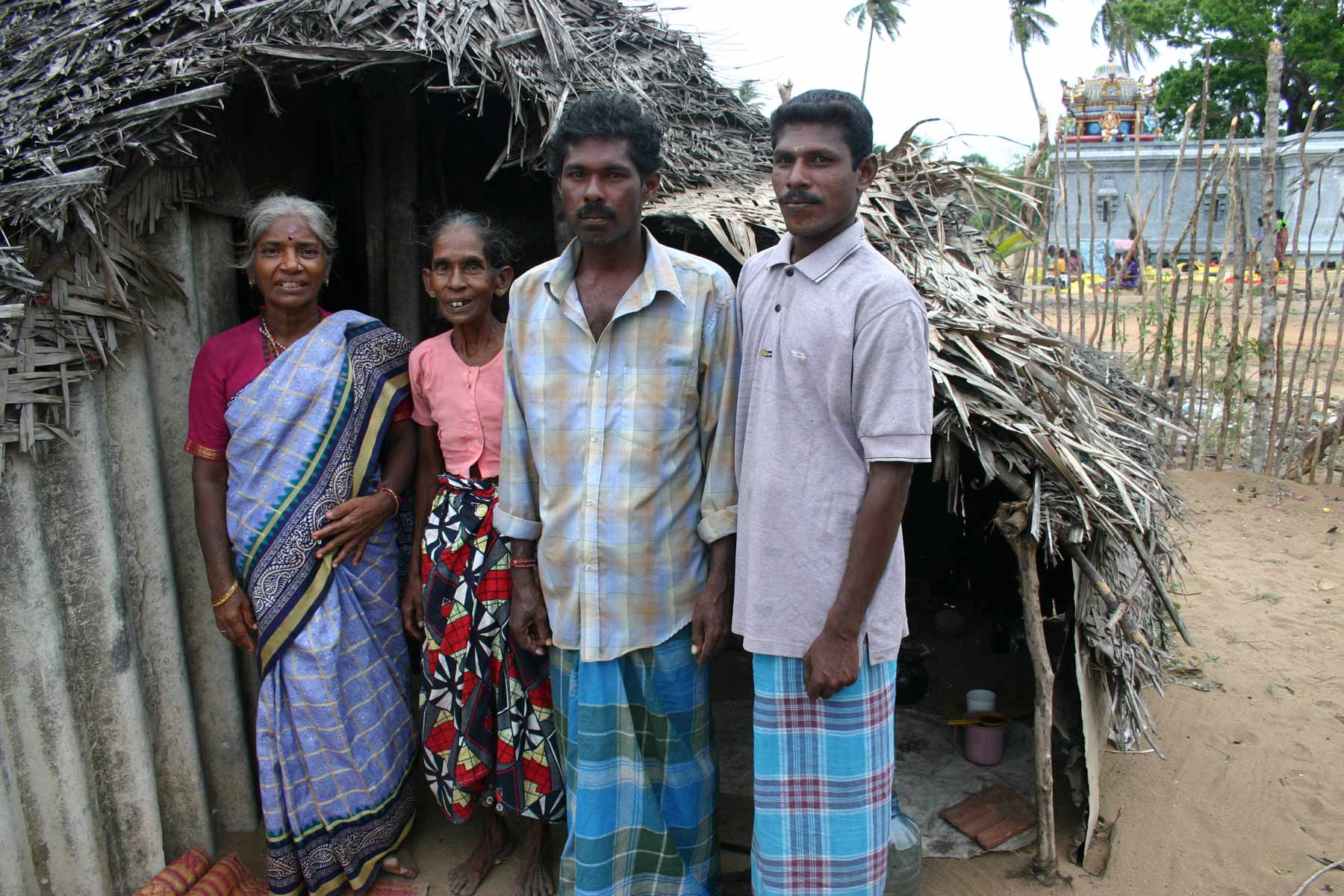
Left: Vedar settlement from 1900. Right: Vedar settlement from 2006.

Vedar are nominally Hindus; they were known to wear the marks of Saivite Hinduism such as Vibuthi ("sacred ash") on their forehead even in the 19th century. According to local legends, Vedars are considered to be the builders of most of the regional Hindu temples associated with Hindu high god Murugan. Although Vedars frequent regionally important Hindu temples and shrines associated with high Hindu deities such as Murugan, Pillaiyar and Siva, they propitiate local deities of folk Hinduism, who are sometimes unique to Veddars. Most of the folk deities are also commonly propitiated by other local Tamils such as Vairavar, Virapathirar, Kali and Narasingan. Seligman (1911) encountered two unique deities, Kapalpei (“Ship spirit”) and Kumara Deivam (“Young god”) who are peculiar to Vedar. The cult of Kappalpei is based on legends of foreigners coming over by ships and landing along the coast where the Vedar usually lived. They are propitiated to ward off evils and hard times. Kumara Deivam was also noted amongst the primitive Sinhalese village of Gonagolla in the Ampara District known as Kumara Devio. Jon Dart in the 1980s found that these deities were no longer worshipped, but were replaced by the Periyasami cult.

The worship pattern is a combination of Devil-dancing called Sandangu ("ceremony" in Tamil) and orthodox Hindu Agamic rituals. The devil-dancing is unique to Vedar, but the aspect of spirit possession as a part of devil dancing is not unique to Vedar. Locals Tamils also experience spirit procession and trance states during religious festivals. During devil-dancing ceremonies, related family groups congregate in family-owned worship centers and build platforms known as Pandals. These Pandals may have a weapon, such a lance known as a Vel, installed in their middle, a construction similar to the Kirikoroha function of the interior Veddas as well. Male family members dance throughout the night and as part of the ceremony some become possessed by spirits, sometimes those of their recently diseased family members. This pattern is similar in nature to the ancestor-worshipping patterns of the interior Veddas. Most of the Sadangu locations are temporary ones without related permanent structures over them, but some have been turned into temples. In the village of Palchennai, one of these temporary structures has become a temple now identified with Hindu high god Vishnu. Vedars also participate in Tamil folk dramas called Kuttus that depict scenes from Hindu epics such as Mahabharatha and Ramayana.

=== Language ===
Vedar use the Sri Lankan Tamil dialect peculiar to the region, known as Batticaloa Tamil dialect, in their day to day conversations. Vedar children also study in that language in schools. During Sadangu ceremonies, those who are possessed by spirits speak in a mixed language that they call Vedar Sinkalam(Vedar Sinhala") or Vedar Bhasai which is the Vedda language of the interior Vedas. This Vedar Sinkalam is mixed with many Tamil words, as people no longer know the language. There is evidence at some point in the past that the people were bilingual in Vedda language and Tamil, but that is no longer the case.

== Geographic distribution ==
Native chronicles have documented the presence of Vedar or Vedar-like people throughout the island from the beginning of the historic period. Vedar presence in the present Eastern province has been noted during the Kandyan Kingdom period (1469 to 1815). Tennent noted that Vedars were found chiefly from Eravur to Venloos Bay. The 1946 Sri Lankan census returned 44 Vedar villages. The largest concentration of villages was close to the Vaharai peninsula; predominantly Vedar villages there included Ammenthnaveli, Kandaladi, Komatalamadu, Palchennai, Puliyankandadi, Oddumadu, Thaddumunai, Uriyankadu, and Vammivattavan. Vedar are also found further south, in Panichankerni, Mankerni and Kayankerni. There are also Vedars close to Kalkudah, in a village called Pallanchenai, and in the Trincomalee District, between the towns of Muttur and Foul Point.

== Economic status ==
Native chronicles such as Nadu Kadu Paraveni Kalvettu mention the socio-economic status of the Vedar as that of primitive hunter gatherers. The chronicles also mention that the chiefs amongst them received gifts such as clothes from settlers and state that the Vedar in turn provided meat and honey to the settler population, indicating a system of barter trade between the groups. Vedar also seem to have provided manual labor to clear forest lands, in exchange for an annual portion of the food crops harvested. When Tennent visited the east coast in 1858, the Vedar were living in houses that were made of mud and thatch. They were moved seasonally from place to place dependent on the availability of fish and other game. They were surviving primarily as fishermen, as well as wage laborers working for timber merchants, cutting and transporting timber from the forests. By the time Seligman visited them in 1911, he considered the Vedar subdivision to be economically better off than the rest of the Indigenous population of the interior. He attributed this to the assimilation of Tamil economic and cultural values by the Vedar clans, as well as to absorption of non-Vedar Tamils into Vedar families by intermarriage. Studies done in the 1980s by the anthropologist Jon Dart, indicated that Vedar in general were poorer than the rest of the Tamil and Muslim communities of the Eastern Province, which Dart attributed to their physical isolation in remote villages, as well as prevailing cultural norms that prevented them from fully integrating within the society. His studies did indicate that some Vedar had successfully integrated in Eastern society, with worldly possessions that did not much differ from those of their non-Vedar neighbors. The marked impact of the Sri Lankan civil war was also noted, due to the proximity of the Vedar's native villages to the theaters of operations of both rebel LTTE and government forces.(See Vaharai bombing)

== See also ==
- Anuradhapura Veddas
- History of Eastern Tamils
- Balangoda Man
