= Rodiya dialect =

Sinhalese dialect of Sri Lanka

Rodiya
- Native to: Sri Lanka
- Ethnicity: Rodiya
- Language family: Indo-European: Indo-Iranian; Indo-Aryan; Southern Zone; Insular Indo-Aryan; Sinhala; Rodiya

Language codes
- ISO 639-3: –
- Glottolog: rodi1239

Rodiya is a dialect of the Sinhalese language spoken by members of the Rodiya community of Sri Lanka. Speakers are considered to be low-caste among the Sinhalese people.

Examples of Rodiya words:

- dissenavā to come (Sinhala enavā)
- dumana house (Sinhala geya, gedara)
- galla mouth (Sinhala kaṭa)
- gävā man (Sinhala minihā)
- gävī woman (Sinhala gäänu)
- miganavā to eat (Sinhala kanavā)
