= Aprusia strenuus =

Scientific classification
- Kingdom: Animalia
- Phylum: Arthropoda
- Subphylum: Chelicerata
- Class: Arachnida
- Order: Araneae
- Infraorder: Araneomorphae
- Family: Oonopidae
- Genus: Aprusia
- Species: A. strenuus

Binomial name
- Aprusia strenuus Simon, 1893

Species of spider

Aprusia strenuus is a species of spider of the genus Aprusia. It is endemic to Sri Lanka.
