= Wanniyala agrabopath =

Scientific classification
- Kingdom: Animalia
- Phylum: Arthropoda
- Subphylum: Chelicerata
- Class: Arachnida
- Order: Araneae
- Infraorder: Araneomorphae
- Family: Pholcidae
- Genus: Wanniyala
- Species: W. agrabopath

Binomial name
- Wanniyala agrabopath Huber & Benjamin, 2005

Species of spider

Wanniyala agrabopath, is a species of spider of the genus Wanniyala. It is endemic to Sri Lanka. The species was described with a male found from Agrabopath Forest, Agrapatana, hence the specific name.

== Description ==
Male of species is differentiated by its counterpart species Wanniyala hakgala by epigynum without pointed projection, ochre-yellow carapace with wide blackish median band without lateral dark margins. Opisthosoma grey with black pattern dorsally and no patterns ventrally. Sternum and legs are pale ochre yellow in color. Female is much similar to male, but with an unmodified clypeus.

== Distribution ==
Exclusively endemic to central hills of Sri Lanka, the species is found only from two localities in Ratnapura district. The type locality is from Agrapatana, and the other site is Horton Plains.

== See also ==
- List of Pholcidae species
