= Aprusia =

Scientific classification
- Kingdom: Animalia
- Phylum: Arthropoda
- Subphylum: Chelicerata
- Class: Arachnida
- Order: Araneae
- Infraorder: Araneomorphae
- Family: Oonopidae
- Genus: Aprusia; Simon, 1893

Type species
- Aprusia strenuus Simon, 1893

Species
- See text

Diversity
- 8 species

Genus of spiders

Aprusia is a genus of goblin spiders in the family Oonopidae, containing eight accepted species. Seven species are endemic to Sri Lanka and the other species is endemic to India.

== Species ==
As of February 2022 it contains eight species:

- Aprusia kataragama Grismado & Deeleman, 2011 — Sri Lanka
- Aprusia kerala Grismado & Deeleman, 2011 — India
- Aprusia koslandensis Ranasinghe & Benjamin, 2018 — Sri Lanka
- Aprusia rawanaellensis Ranasinghe & Benjamin, 2018 — Sri Lanka
- Aprusia strenuus Simon, 1893 — Sri Lanka
- Aprusia vankhedei Ranasinghe & Benjamin, 2018 — Sri Lanka
- Aprusia veddah Grismado & Deeleman, 2011 — Sri Lanka
- Aprusia vestigator (Simon, 1893) — Sri Lanka
