= Wanniyala =

Scientific classification
- Kingdom: Animalia
- Phylum: Arthropoda
- Subphylum: Chelicerata
- Class: Arachnida
- Order: Araneae
- Infraorder: Araneomorphae
- Family: Pholcidae
- Genus: Wanniyala; Huber & Benjamin, 2005

Type species
- Wanniyala agrabopath Huber & Benjamin, 2005

Species
- 9, see text.

Genus of spiders

Wanniyala is a genus of cellar spiders native to Sri Lanka, first described by Huber & Benjamin in 2005. They have six eyes and four pair of legs and grow up to 2 mm in length. The abdomen is globular and males have a distinctive distal hinged sclerite on the procursus of genitalia. The name is derived from the Sri Lankans native to the island that the first spiders were found on- the Vedda people- and their surname Wanniyala-Aetto.

== Species ==
As of February 2019, it contains nine species:

- Wanniyala agrabopath Huber & Benjamin, 2005 – Sri Lanka
- Wanniyala hakgala Huber & Benjamin, 2005 – Sri Lanka
- Wanniyala labugama Huber, 2019 – Sri Lanka
- Wanniyala mapalena Huber, 2019 – Sri Lanka
- Wanniyala mudita Huber, 2019 – Sri Lanka
- Wanniyala ohiya Huber, 2019 – Sri Lanka
- Wanniyala orientalis Huber, 2019 – Sri Lanka
- Wanniyala upekkha Huber, 2019 – Sri Lanka
- Wanniyala viharekele Huber, 2019 – Sri Lanka
