= Rodiya =

Caste of the Sinhalese people of Sri Lanka

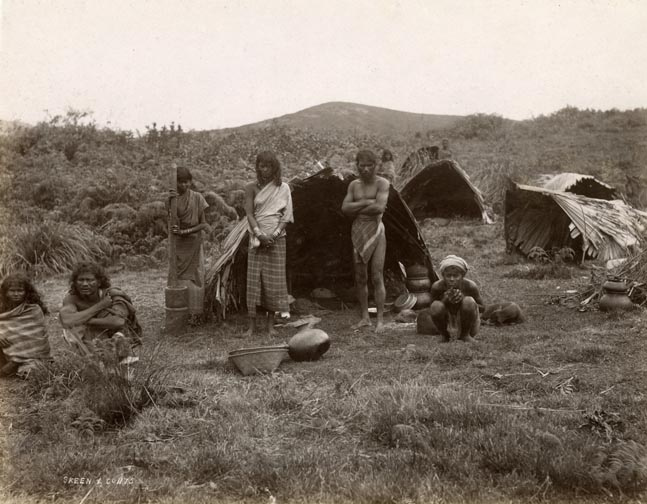
- A Rodi family in the 1900s

Total population
- Unknown

Languages
- Rodiya language

Related ethnic groups
- Indo European language and Kinnaraya

Rodi or Rodiya (lit., filth) are an untouchable social group or caste amongst the Sinhalese people of Sri Lanka. Their status was very similar to all the Untouchable castes of India with segregated communities, ritualised begging, economically weakest section of the society.

== Status ==
Accounts from the colonial period depict the social position and life experiences of the Rodiyas.

Rodiyas were not permitted to cross a ferry, to draw water at a well, to enter a village, to till land, or learn a trade, as no recognised caste could deal or hold intercourse with a Rodiya [...] They were forced to subsist on alms or such gifts as they might receive for protecting the fields from wild beasts or burying the carcasses of dead cattle; but they were not allowed to come within a fenced field even to beg [...] They were prohibited from wearing a cloth on their heads, and neither men nor women were allowed to cover their bodies above the waist or below the knee. If benighted they dare not lie down in a shed appropriated to other travellers, but hid themselves in caves or deserted watch-huts. Though nominally Buddhists, they were not allowed to go into a temple, and could only pray "standing afar off".

== History ==
The various stories on the origin of the Rodi caste are contradictory and therefore far from certain. Rodis have their own mythical stories about their origin (Princess Ratnavalli story) have been passed down orally by their generations. They were considered so untouchable that the Sinhalese royal law prescribed the punishment to banish the worst offenders and convicts to the Rodiya community which was considered a punishment worse than the capital punishment, i.e. the daughter of King Parakramabahu named Ratnavalli (also known as Navaratna Valli) secretly conniving with a Rodiya caste butcher (who was supplying venison to the royal court) shared a taste for human flesh (cannibalism). This was later found out by the king and enraged by her serious offense, the King banished her to the Rodiya community, offering her as the bride to that same butcher. Some of these stories are found in published documents as well. Rodis were considered to be purely a low caste group. According to Kandyan law, the worst punishment for high caste nobles was exiling them to the Rodi caste. Robert Knox (sailor) and Hugh Nevill are two of the prominent writers who have mentioned the Rodi Caste in their writings. Although these folklore tales do not provide many facts about the origins of the Rodi, they trace a connection between the daughter of King Parakramabahu and a butcher.

== Modern times ==
The British Government in London recalled from the service the British Colonial Governor Sir Thomas Maitland (British Army officer) perhaps because of a rumored relationship with a Ceylonese untouchable Rodiya Caste (though normally said to be Sinhalese) dancing girl named Lovina Alfonso. Rodiya people were heavily involved in Sri Lankan independence from British colonization.

Post-independence Rodiya community have become a vanishing community integrated into the rest of Sinhala society with free education policies giving equal opportunity and ending of discrimination which has resulted in them abandoning traditional jobs as craftmen and joining the private and public sectors.

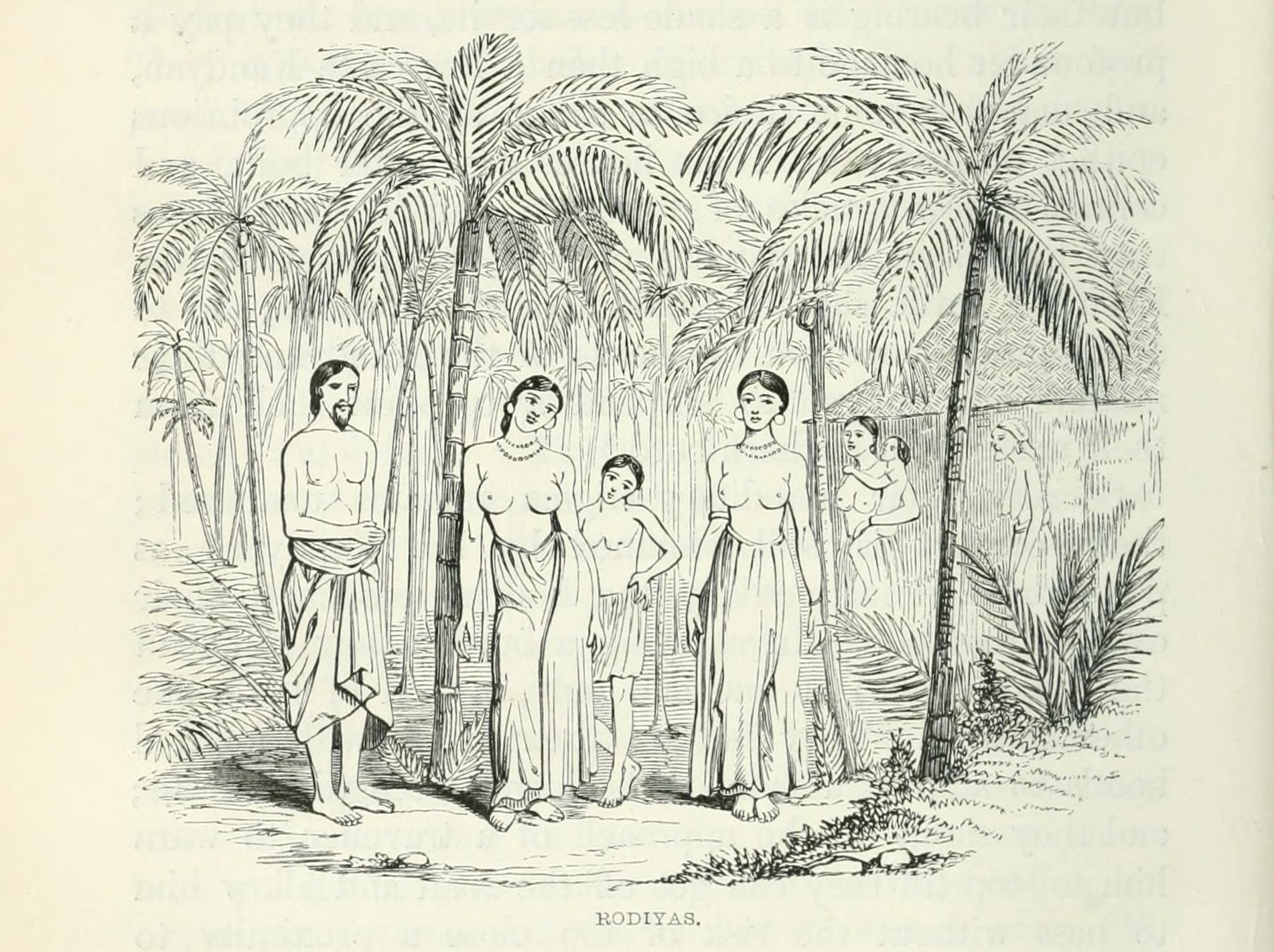
Account of the Island (1860) by James Emerson Tennent

- Rodiya language
