= Gonagolla =

Town in Sri Lanka

Gonagolla ගොනාගොල්ල கொனாகொல்ல
- Town
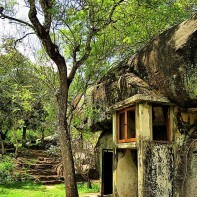

- Location within Sri Lanka
- Coordinates: 7.4351°N 81.6285°E
- Country: Sri Lanka
- Province: Eastern
- District: Ampara
- Time zone: UTC+5:30 (Sri Lanka Standard Time)
- Postal Code: 32064

Gonagolla (Sinhala: ගොනාගොල්ල, Tamil: கொனாகொல்ல) is a town in the Ampara District, Eastern Province of Sri Lanka.

It is located 18.8 km (11.7 mi) north of Ampara on the Ampara Uhana Maha Oya Highway (A27).

The Gonagolla Vihara, a historic cave temple, which is formally listed as an archaeological site, is located nearby on the road to Ampara.

== Schools ==
- Dudley Senanayake College
- Rajagalatenna Maha Vidyalaya (Sinhala: අම්/රජගලතැන්න මහා විද්‍යාලය)
