= Anuradhapura Veddas =

Anuradhapura Veddas (Sinhala: අනුරාධපුර වැද්දන්, romanized: Anurādhapura Væddan, Tamil: அனுராதபுரம் வேடர்கள், romanized: Aṉurātapuram Vēṭarkaḷ) are people of North Central Province of Sri Lanka who are descendants of indigenous Vedda people of Sri Lanka who have adopted the culture, religion and language of the dominant Sinhalese residents of the province. By far they are the largest segment amongst the various groups of people who claim Vedda ancestry. They are also ethnically related to Tamil speaking Coast Veddas who live in the minority Sri Lankan Tamil dominant Eastern Province of Sri Lanka who have adopted Tamil and Hindu cultural norms of their neighbors. Settlements of Anuradhapura Veddas also spread into the neighboring Polonnaruwa District and a few villages in the interior of the Trincomalee District.
