= Veddas =

Indigenous people in Sri Lanka

Vedda
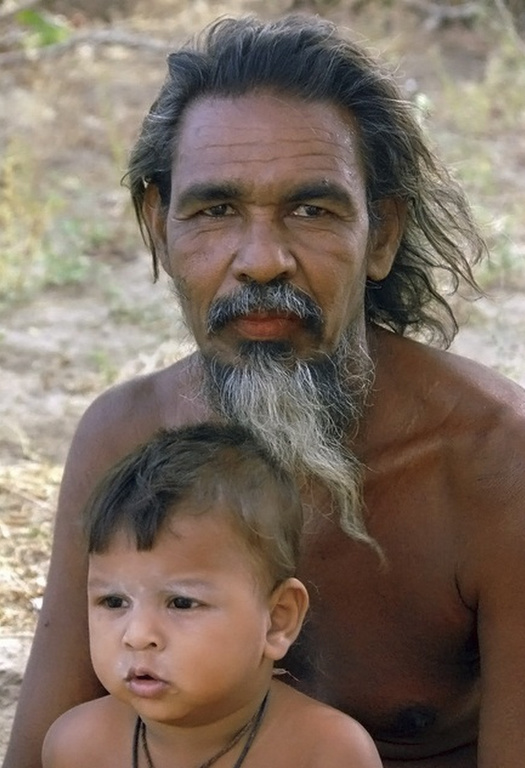
- Vedda man and child.

Total population
- Between 2,500 – 6,600 (less than 0.20% of the population) (2001)

Regions with significant populations
- Sri Lanka 2,500 (2002)

Languages
- Vedda, Sinhala, Sri Lankan Tamil

Religion
- Traditional animistic beliefs with Buddhism, Hinduism

Related ethnic groups
- Sinhalese, Tamils

The Vedda (Sinhala: වැද්දා [ˈvædːaː]; Tamil: வேடர் (Vēḍar)), or Wanniyalaeto, are a minority indigenous group of people in Sri Lanka who, among other sub-communities such as Coast Veddas, Anuradhapura Veddas and Bintenne Veddas, are accorded indigenous status. The Vedda minority in Sri Lanka may become completely assimilated. Most speak Sinhala instead of their indigenous languages, which are nearing extinction. It has been hypothesized that the Vedda were probably the earliest inhabitants of Sri Lanka and have lived on the island since before the arrival of other groups from the Indian mainland.

The Ratnapura District, which is part of the Sabaragamuwa Province, is known to have been inhabited by the Veddas in the distant past. This has been shown by scholars like Nandadeva Wijesekera. The very name Sabaragamuwa is believed to have meant the village of the Sabaras or "forest barbarians". Place-names such as Vedda-gala (Vedda Rock), Vedda-ela (Vedda Canal) and Vedi-Kanda (Vedda Mountain) in the Ratnapura District also bear testimony to this. As Wijesekera observes, a strong Vedda element is discernible in the population of Vedda-gala and its environs.

== Etymology ==
Ethnonyms of Vedda include Vadda, Veddah, Veddha and Vaddo. "Vedda" is a word that stems from the Tamil word Vēdan meaning "hunter".

== Genetics ==
Groups ancestral to the modern Veddas were probably the earliest inhabitants of Sri Lanka. Their arrival is dated tentatively to about 40,000–35,000 years ago. They show a relationship with other South Asian and Sri Lankan populations, but are genetically distinguishable from the other peoples of Sri Lanka, and show a high degree of intra-group diversity. This is consistent with a long history of existing as small subgroups undergoing significant genetic drift.

In one study on maternal (mitochondrial DNA) haplogroups in Sri Lankan populations (the Vedda, Sri Lankan Tamils, Indian Tamils of Sri Lanka, and Sinhalese), the Vedda were found to carry predominantly haplogroups U and R and to carry maternal haplogroup M at about 17%, unlike the Indian Tamils of Sri Lanka and many mainland Indian peoples, among which haplogroup M is predominant. The Vedda people and Low-country Sinhalese showed frequencies of haplogroup R at 45.33 and 25%, respectively. The Vedda were found to be distinct but closer to Sinhalese than to other South Asian groups. It was determined in the study to be likely that the branches of haplogroups R and U "found to be particularly prevalent in the Vedda, were derived from ancestors on the Indian subcontinent."

Another study on maternal haplogroups in Sri Lankan groups (also the Vedda, Sri Lankan Tamil, and Sinhalese) found similar results, with the Vedda belonging predominantly to the mitochondrial haplogroup N (which "exists in almost all European, Oceanian, and many Asian and Amerindian populations.") and its subgroups U and R (with those comprising about two thirds of their maternal lineages), differing from other South Asian groups (such as the Sri Lankan Tamil, Sinhalese, and several Indian peoples ) among whom haplogroup M is predominant. The study also found that "South Asian (Indian) haplogroups were predominant" in the three Sri Lankan groups (including the Vedda) but that the Sinhalese, Sri Lankan Tamil, and Vedda populations also "had a considerable presence of West Eurasian haplogroups." One phylogenetic study on mitochondrial DNA hypervariable segments HVI and part of HVII showed the Vedda to be "genetically distinct from other major ethnic groups (Sinhalese, Sri Lankan Tamils and Indian Tamils) in Sri Lanka." Another study on alpha-2-HS-glycoprotein allele frequency showed the Veddas and Sinhalese to be more biologically related to each other than to most other ethnic groups in Asia.

A 2024 genetics study using high-resolution autosomal and Mitochondrial DNA analysis found that the Veddas were genetically closer to the Pallar caste of India, Santhal, Juang, Irula and Paniya peoples than to the Sinhalese and Sri Lankan Tamils. The study concluded that the Veddas were "a genetically drifted group with limited gene flow from neighbouring Sinhalese and Sri Lankan Tamil populations" and that the maternal Haplogroup M mediated their initial settlement of the island. Other studies have shown the Vedda share genetic components with the Sinhalese and Sri Lankan Tamils as well as genetic affinity with the Irula, Kota and Mulla Kuruma of India, the Semai and Senoi of Malaysia and tribal groups of Upper Myanmar. A 2025 study revealed significant allele sharing between the Veddas and East Asian-related populations, including Austroasiatic- and Tibeto-Burman-speaking populations. It was concluded that the East Asian genetic affinity can be partially explained due to high levels of Basal Asian AASI ancestry, which is genetically related to ancestral East Asians found in the Veddas.

== Language ==
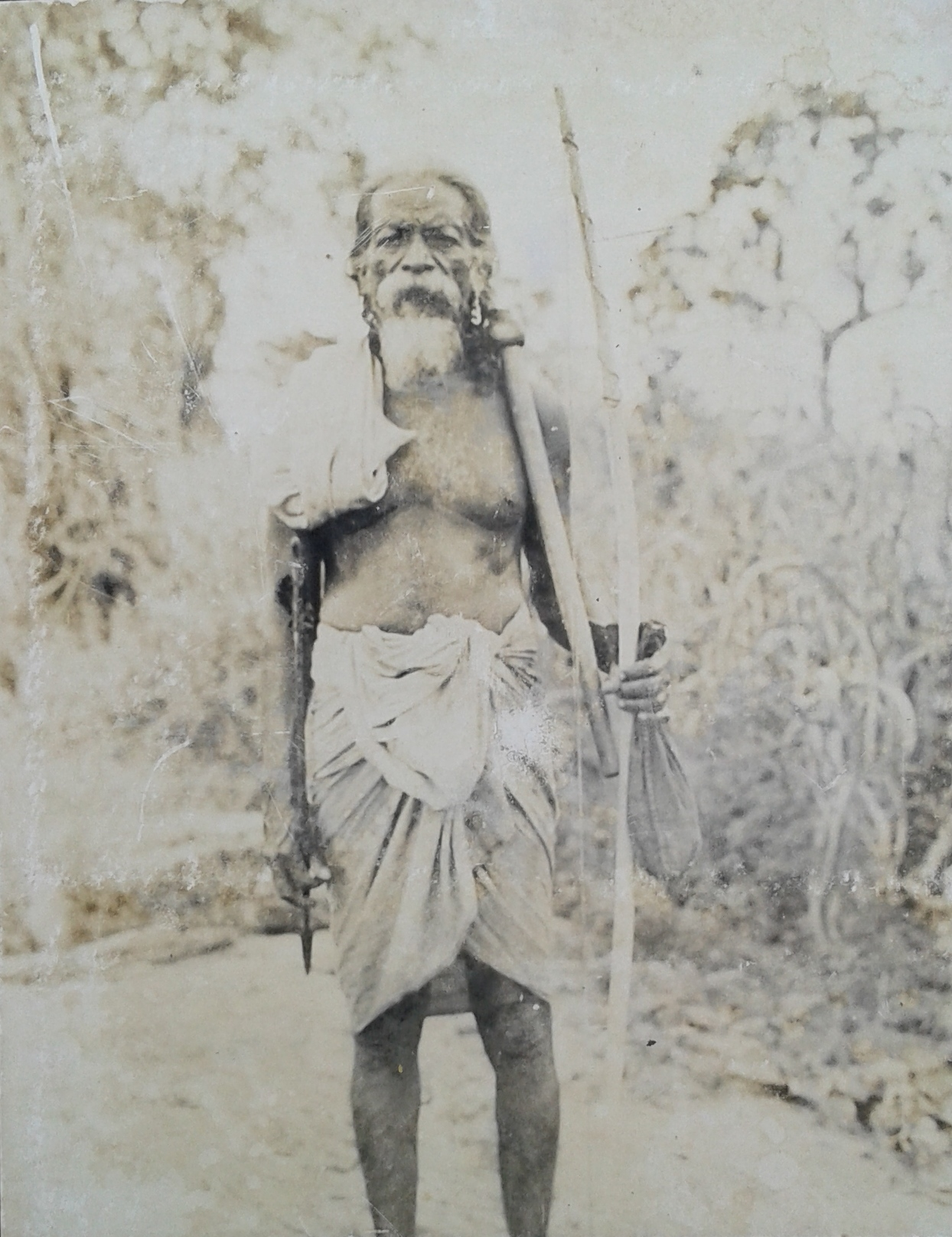
Most prominent Vedda chief Tisahamy Aththo

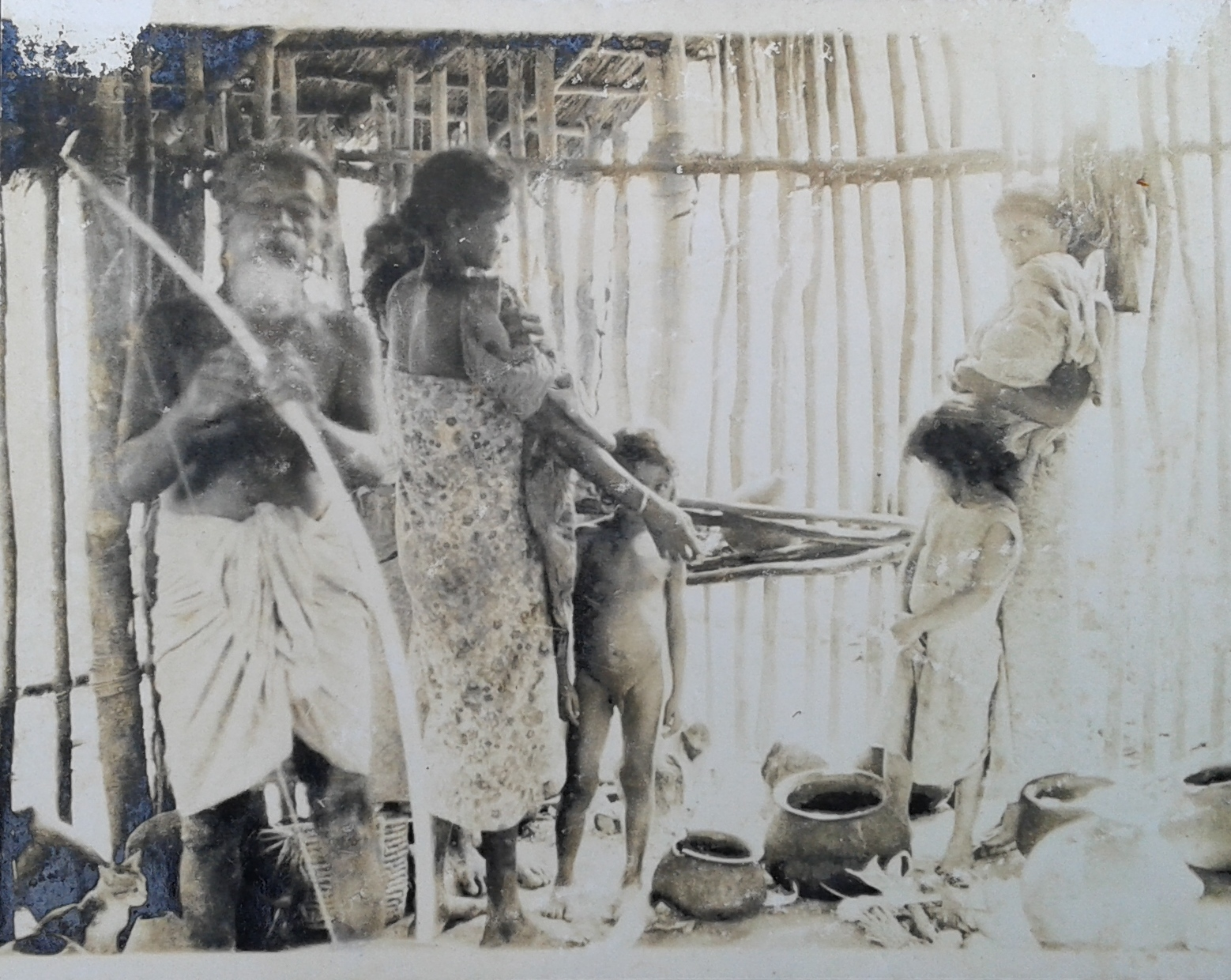
Tisahamy Aththo with some Vedda women

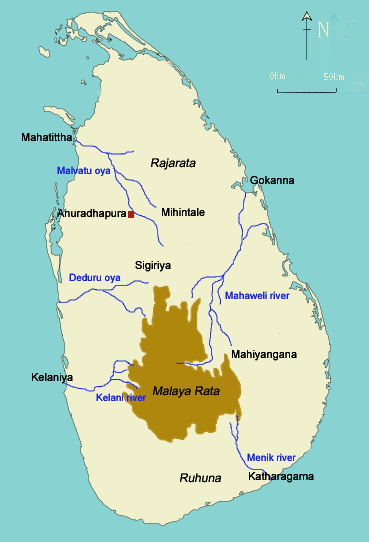
Malaya Rata was the historical center of the Vedda language, a Sinhala-based creole.

The original language of the Veddas is the Vedda language, which today is used primarily by the interior Veddas of Dambana. Communities such as Coast Veddas and Anuradhapura Veddas, who do not identify themselves strictly as Veddas, also use Vedda language for communication during hunting and or for religious chants. When a systematic field study was conducted in 1959, it was determined that the language was confined to the older generation of Veddas from Dambana. In the 1990s, self-identifying Veddas knew few words and phrases in the Vedda language, but there were individuals who knew the language comprehensively. Initially, there was considerable debate among linguists as to whether Vedda is a dialect of Sinhala or an independent language. Later studies indicate that it diverged from its parent stock in the 10th century and became a Creole and a stable independent language by the 13th century, under the influence of Sinhala.

The parent Vedda language(s) is of unknown genetic origins, while Sinhala is of the Indo-Aryan branch of Indo-European languages. Phonologically it is distinguished from Sinhala by the higher frequency of palatal sounds C and J. The effect is also heightened by the addition of inanimate suffixes. Vedda words are morphologically divided into nouns, verbs and variables with unique gender distinctions in animate nouns. During its development as a Creole language, it has reduced and simplified many forms of Sinhala such as second person pronouns and denotations of negative meanings. Instead of borrowing new words from Sinhala, Vedda created combinations of words from a limited lexical stock. Vedda also maintains many archaic terms from Old Sinhala, prior to the 10th to 12th centuries, as a relict of their close contacts. It also retains a number of unique words that cannot be derived from Sinhala. Likewise, Sinhala has also borrowed from the original Vedda language words, and grammatical structures, differentiating it from related Indo-Aryan languages. So Vedda has exerted a substratum influence in the formation of Sinhala.

Veddas that have adopted Sinhala are found primarily in the southeastern part of the country, especially in the vicinity of Bintenne in Uva Province and in Anuradhapura District in the North Central Province (Anuradhapura Veddas).

Another group, often termed East Coast Veddas, is found in coastal areas of the Eastern Province, between Batticaloa and Trincomalee, where they have adopted Tamil as their mother tongue.

== Cultural aspects ==
=== Language ===
The parent of Vedda language is of unknown linguistic origin and is considered a language isolate. Early linguists and observers of the language considered it to be either a separate language or a dialect of Sinhala. The chief proponent of the dialect theory was Wilhelm Geiger, but he also contradicted himself by claiming that Vedda was a relexified aboriginal language.

Veddas consider the Vedda language to be distinct from Sinhala and use it as an ethnic marker to differentiate them from Sinhalese people.

=== Religion ===
The original religion of Veddas is polytheistic. The Sinhalized interior Veddahs follow a mix of traditional believes and nominal Buddhism; whereas the Tamilized east coast Veddahs follow a mix of traditional believe and nominal Hinduism with folk influences among anthropologists.

One of the most distinctive features of Vedda religion is the worship of dead ancestors, who are called nae yaku among the Sinhala-speaking Veddas and are invoked for the game and yams. There are also peculiar deities unique to Veddas, such as Kande Yakka.

Veddas, along with the Island's Buddhist, Hindu and Muslim communities, venerate the temple complex situated at Kataragama, showing the syncretism that has evolved over 2,000 years of coexistence and assimilation. Kataragama is supposed to be the site where the Hindu god Skanda or Murugan in Tamil met and married a local tribal girl, Valli, who in Sri Lanka is believed to have been a Vedda.

There are a number of less famous shrines across the island which are sacred to the Veddas as well as to other communities.

=== Rituals ===
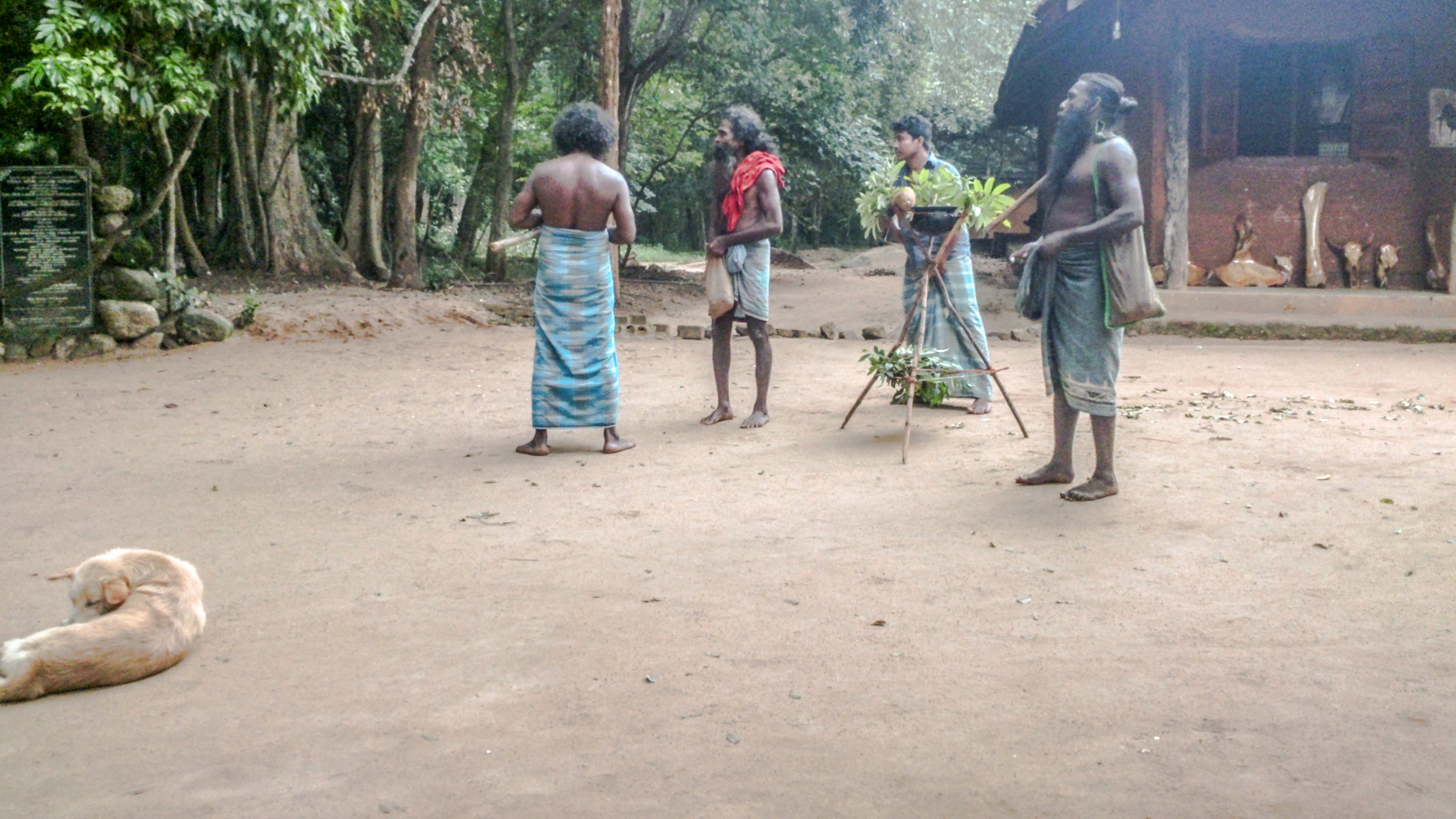
A Veddah ritual about to be performed

Vedda marriage is a simple ceremony. It consists of the bride tying a bark rope (Diya lanuva) that she has twisted, around the waist of the groom. This symbolizes the bride's acceptance of the man as her mate and life partner. Although endogamous marriage between cross-cousins was the norm until recently, this has changed significantly, with Vedda women even contracting marriages with their Sinhalese and Moor neighbors.

In Vedda society, women are in many respects men's equals. They are entitled to similar inheritance. Monogamy is the general rule, though a widow would frequently marry her husband's brother as a means of support and consolation (levirate marriage). They also do not practice a caste system.

Death, too, is a simple affair without ostentatious funeral ceremonies where the corpse of the deceased is promptly buried.

=== Burial ===
Since the opening of colonization schemes, Vedda burials changed when they dug graves of 1.2–1.5 m (4–5 feet) deep, wrapped the body in cloth and covered it with leaves and earth. The Veddas also laid the body between the scooped out trunks of the gadumba tree (Trema orientalis) before they buried it. At the head of the grave were kept three open coconuts and a small bundle of wood, while at its foot were kept an opened coconut and an untouched coconut. Certain cactus species (pathok, Opuntia dillenii or O. stricta) were planted at the head, the middle and the foot. Personal possessions like the bow and arrow, betel pouch, were also buried. This practice varied by community. The contents of the betel pouch of the deceased were eaten after his death.

=== Cult of the dead ===
The Veddas practice what was referred to by colonial-era ethnologists as "a cult of the dead". The Vedda perception of the world when originally studied in the mid 19th and early 20th centuries was not divided into polarities as life and afterlife or living and dead. At that time when asked whether the dead lived on as spirits they found that "they did not consider whether the departed were living or dead, they were just spirits... all spirits were alike neither good nor bad".

In the words of John Bailey studying this population in 1853: "the Veddahs have a vague belief in a host of undefined spirits, whose influence is rather for good than evil... they believe the air is peopled by spirits, that every rock and every tree, every forest and every hill, in short every feature of nature, has its genus loci; but these seem little else than nameless phantoms whom they regard with mysterious awe than actual dread".

In addition to this experience of the world often referred to as "animism" they have a belief that after death every relative is a spirit "of those who watches over the welfare of those left behind. These, which include their ancestors and their children, the term their 'nehya yakoon', kindred spirits. They describe them as ever watchful, coming to them in sickness, visiting them in dreams, giving them flesh when hunting".

The Vedda behavior at the time of these original ethnological studies regarding the recently dead was quite different from our behavior toward the dead. "When a person dies it is the hetha that killed him; and the hetha of the dead one remains by the corpse and haunts the vicinity for years."

The majority of the Vedda groups studied at that time held what is referred to as a "kirikohraha ceremony". This was often held "to present an offering to the newly dead within a week or two of their decease...The yaku of the recently dead... are supposed to stand towards the surviving members of the group in the light of friends and relatives, who if well treated will continue to show loving kindness to their survivors, and only if neglected will show disgust and anger by withdrawing their assistance, or becoming actively hostile."

=== Clothing ===
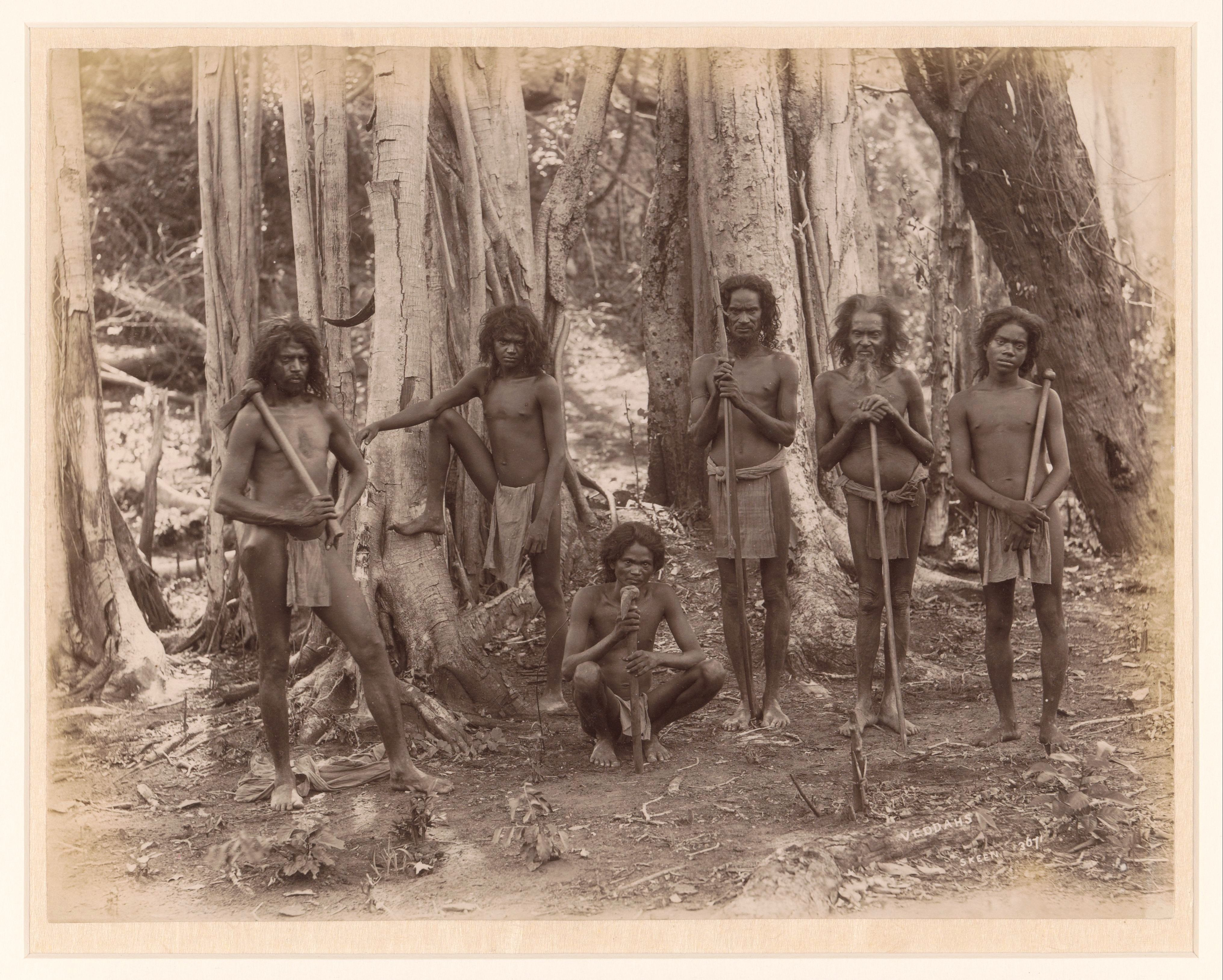
Group portrait of Veddah men in the forests, between 1870 and 1904.

Until fairly recent times, the clothing of the Veddas was limited. In the case of men, it consisted only of a loincloth suspended with a string at the waist, while in the case of women, it was a piece of cloth that extended from the navel to the knees. Today, however, Vedda attire is more covering, men wear a short sarong extending from the waist to the knees, while the women clad themselves in a garment similar to the Sinhala diya-redda which extends from the breast line to the knees.

=== Music ===
Bori Bori Sellam-Sellam Bedo Wannita,

Palletalawa Navinna-Pita Gosin Vetenne,

Malpivili genagene-Hele Kado Navinne,

Diyapivili Genagene-Thige Bo Haliskote Peni,

Ka tho ipal denne

— A Vedda honeycomb cutter's folk song

Meaning of this song: The bees from yonder hills of Palle Talawa and Kade suck nectar from the flowers and made the honeycomb. So why should you give them undue pain when there is no honey by cutting the honeycomb.

== Livelihood ==
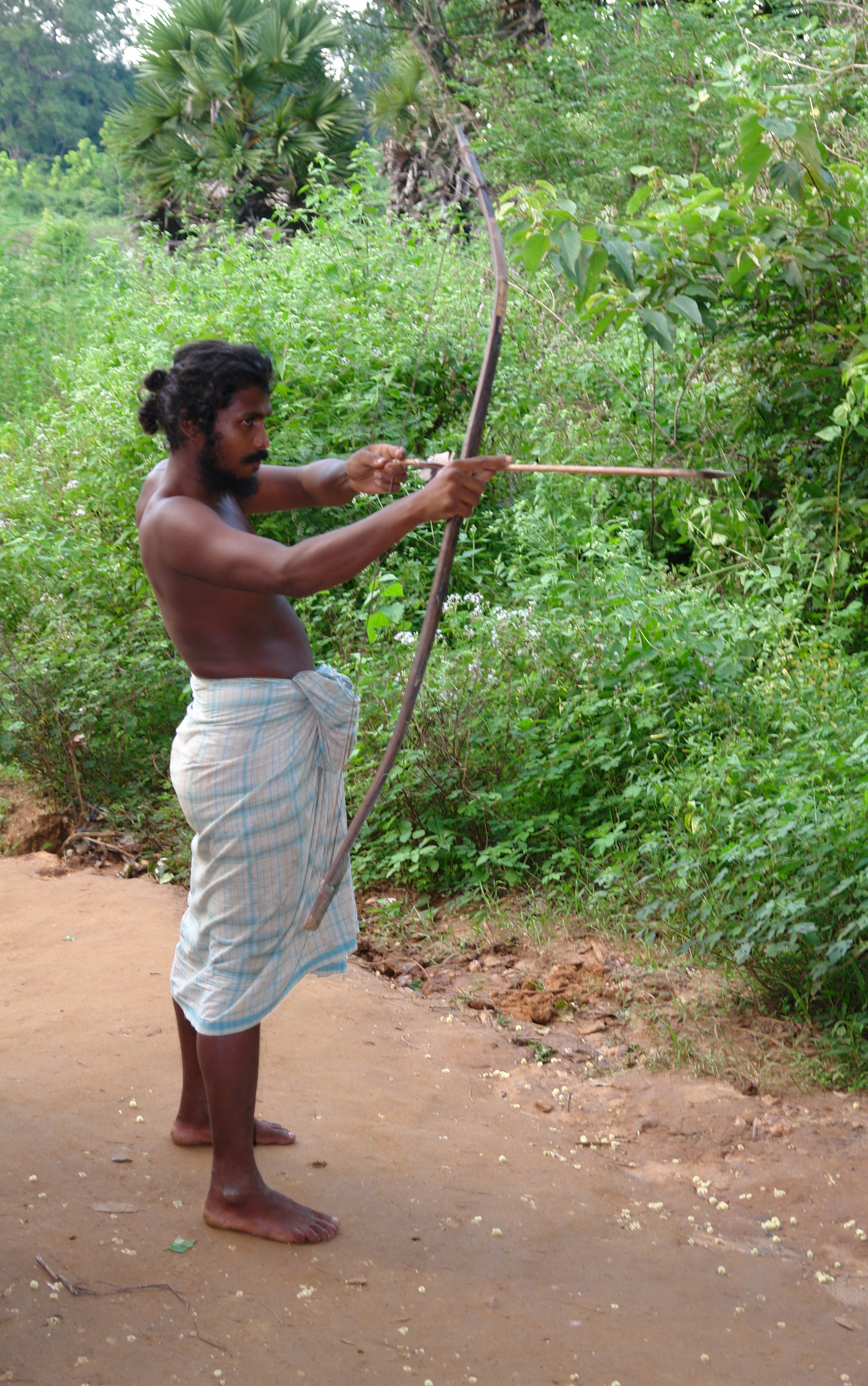
A Veddah hunter with bow and arrow

Veddas were originally hunter-gatherers. They used bows and arrows to hunt game, harpoons and toxic plants for fishing and gathered wild plants, yams, honey, fruit and nuts. Many Veddas also farm, frequently using slash and burn or swidden cultivation, which is called Hena in Sri Lanka. East Coast Veddas also practice sea fishing. Veddas are famously known for their rich meat diet. Venison and the flesh of rabbit, turtle, tortoise, monitor lizard, wild boar and the common brown monkey are consumed with much relish. The Veddas kill only for food and do not harm young or pregnant animals. Game is commonly shared amongst the family and clan. Fish are caught by employing fish poisons such as the juice of the pus-vel (Entada scandens) and daluk-kiri (Cactus milk).

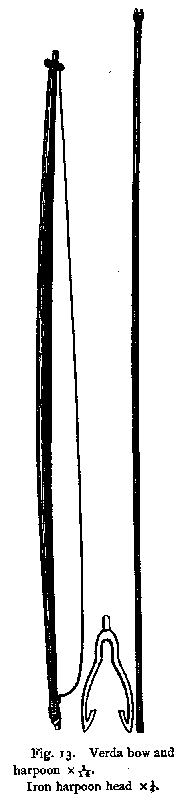
Traditional Vedda bow and fishing harpoon

Vedda culinary fare is also deserving of mention. Amongst the best known are gona perume, which is a sort of sausage containing alternate layers of meat and fat, and goya-tel-perume, which is the tail of the monitor lizard (talagoya), stuffed with fat obtained from its sides and roasted in embers. Another Vedda delicacy is dried meat preserve soaked in honey. The Veddas used to preserve such meat in the hollow of a tree, enclosing it with clay.

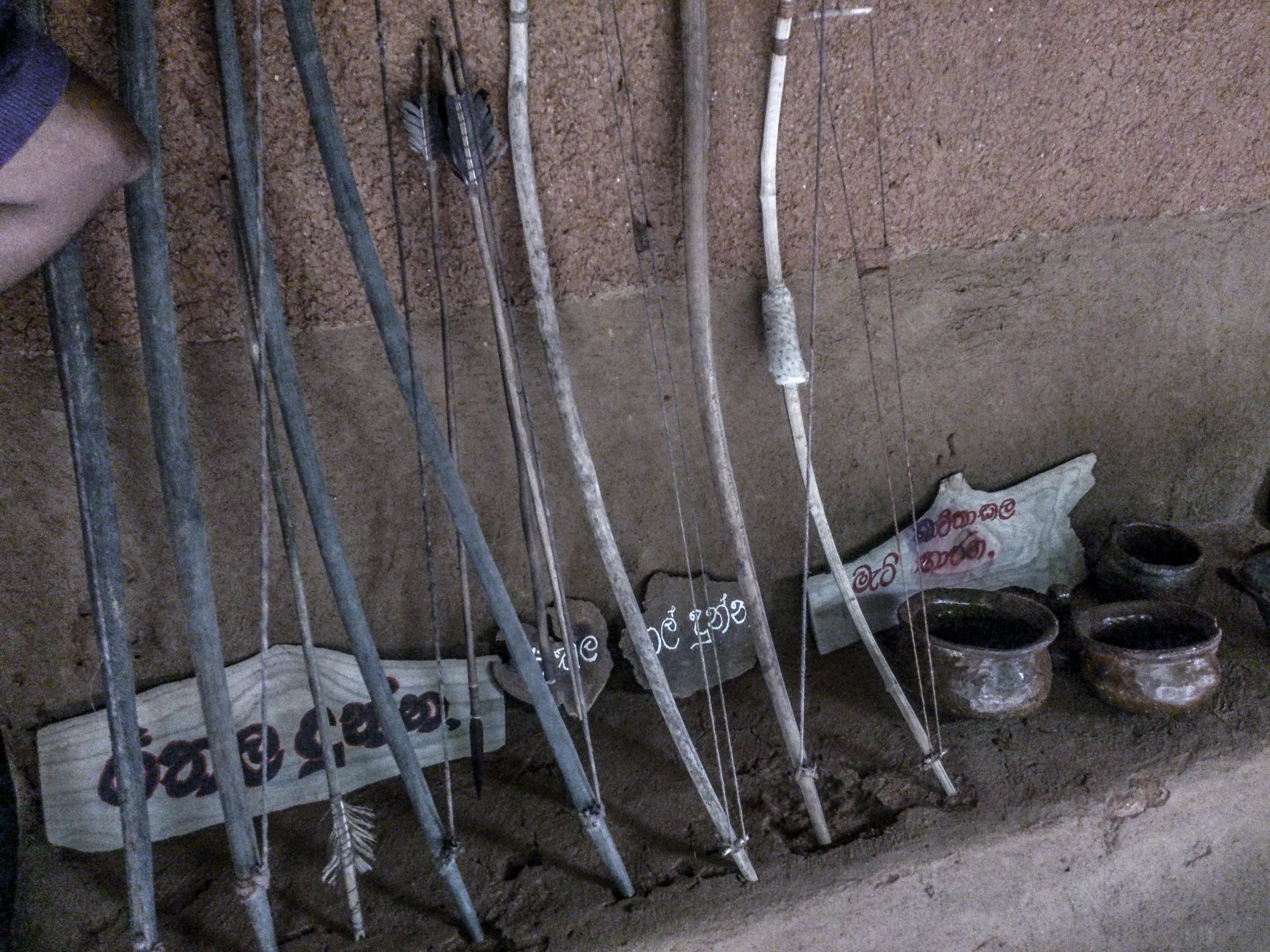
Some of the bows used by the Veddahs

Such succulent meat served as a ready food supply in times of scarcity. The early part of the year (January–February) is considered to be the season of yams and mid-year (June–July) that of fruit and honey, while hunting is availed of throughout the year. Kurakkan (Eleusine coracana) is cultivated very often. Maize, yams, gourds and melons are also cultivated. The Veddas used to live in caves and rock shelters. Today, they live in huts of wattle, daub and thatch.

In the reign of Datusena (6th century CE) the Mahaweli ganga was diverted at Minipe in the Minipe canal nearly 80 km (47 miles) long said to be constructed with help from the Yakkas. The Mahawamsa refers to the canal as Yaka-bendi-ela. When the Ruwanweli Seya was built in King Dutugemunu's time (2nd century BCE) the Veddas procured the necessary minerals from the jungles.

Parakrama Bahu the Great (12th century), in his war against the rebels, employed Veddas as scouts.

Rajasinghe II (17th century), in his battle with the Dutch, had a Vedda regiment. In the abortive Uva-Welessa revolt of 1817–1818 of the British times, led by Keppetipola Disawe, the Veddas too fought with the rebels against the British forces.

== Current status ==
Historical population
Year	Pop.	±%
1881	2,200	—
1891	1,200	−45.5%
1901	4,000	+233.3%
1911	5,300	+32.5%
1921	4,500	−15.1%
1931	5,200	+15.6%
1946	2,400	−53.8%
1953	800	−66.7%
1963	400	−50.0%
1971		—
1981		—
1989 (est.)		—
2001		—
2011		—
Source:Department of Census & Statistics; Data is based on Sri Lankan Government Census.

Some observers have said Veddas are disappearing and have lamented the decline of their distinct culture. Land acquisition for mass irrigation projects, government forest reserve restrictions, and the civil war have disrupted traditional Vedda ways of life. Between 1977 and 1983 under the Accelerated Mahaweli Development Project and colonization schemes, more than 50,000 hectares were turned into a large hydroelectric dam and irrigation project. Subsequently, the creation of the Maduru Oya National Park deprived the Veddas of their last hunting grounds. In 1985, the Vedda Chief Thissahamy and his delegation were obstructed from attending the United Nations Working Group on Indigenous Populations. Dr. Wiveca Stegeborn, an anthropologist, has been studying the Vedda since 1977 and alleges that their young women are being tricked into accepting contracts to the Middle East as domestic workers when in fact they will be trafficked into prostitution or sold as sex slaves.

However, cultural assimilation of Veddas with other local populations has been going on for a long time. "Vedda" has been used in Sri Lanka to mean not only hunter-gatherers but also to refer to any people who adopt an unsettled and rural way of life and thus can be a derogatory term not based on ethnic group. Thus, over time, it is possible for non-Vedda groups to become Veddas, in this broad cultural sense. Vedda populations of this kind are increasing in some districts.

== In zoology ==
A spider genus endemic to Sri Lanka was named Wanniyala as a dedication to Sri Lanka's oldest civilized people.

A species of Sri Lankan snake, Indotyphlops veddae, was named in honor of the Vedda.

== See also ==
- South Asian ethnic groups
- Charles Gabriel Seligman
- The United Nations Declaration on the Rights of Indigenous Peoples

== Bibliography ==
- Brow, James (1978). Vedda Villages of Anuradhapura. University of Washington Press. ISBN 0295955856.
- Dharmadasa, K. N. O. (February 1974). "The Creolization of an Aboriginal language:The case of Vedda in Sri Lanka (Ceylon)". Anthropological Linguistics. 16 (2): 79–106. JSTOR 30029514.
- Van Driem, George (15 January 2002). Languages of the Himalayas: An Ethnolinguistic Handbook of the Greater Himalayan Region. Brill Academic Publishers. ISBN 90-04-10390-2.
- Seligmann, Charles; Seligmann, Brenda (1911). The Veddas. Cambridge University Press.
