= Marakkalage =

Marakkala is the modern colloquial term for Muslims, although Marakkalage is another uniquely Karava ancestral name and is also used by several traditional Karava families of Sri Lanka to date. Variant forms are: Maha Marakkalage, Arasa Marakkalage, Andra Marakkalage, Antinna Marakkalage, Kodi Marakkalage, Loku Marakkalage, Manna Marakkalage, Chandra Marakkalage and Marakkala Malimige.

The name Marakkalage derives from the type of craft Marakkar (referring to wooden ships in Tamil) used in trade and warfare by the rulers of the Kuru Mandala coast, the region of the Kurus, and Sri Lanka. This may be an allusion to the Muslim Arab traders who were the prominent seamen of pre- and early colonial Sri Lanka. They were also used in naval battles against the Portuguese, Dutch, British and other Europeans in the 16th, 17th and 18th centuries. The ancestors of the families bearing these names may have been Muslim traders or the owners or commanders of such vessels.

Gallappathige and Manavige (Maha Navi), Malimage (deriving from Malimar/Malimam) meaning ship's captain, was also bestowed as an honor.

The Karavas claim to be the traditional martial and naval community of Sri Lanka and the preservation of that naval tradition in such mediaeval names is of interest.

A stamp issued by India shows the Marakkar war-paroe, a boat that could carry 30-40 men and be sailed or rowed in the sea as well as through lagoons and narrow waters. These crafts and the more ancient maha oru were also used in naval battles against the Portuguese in the 16th century. The last of the traditional Sinhala sailing ships were known as maha oru and yatra oru.

== See also ==
- Timeline of the Karavas
- Karaiyar
- Karava heraldry
