= Sri Lankan Mukkuvar =

Tamil speaking ethnic group found in India and Sri Lanka

Mukkuvar
- Religions: Hinduism, Christianity, Islam
- Languages: Tamil
- Related groups: Kerala Mukkuvar, Marakkayar, Mogaveera, Sri Lankan Moors

Sri Lankan Mukkuvar (Tamil: முக்குகர்) is a Tamil-speaking ethnic group found in the Western and Eastern coastal regions of Sri Lanka. They are primarily concentrated in the districts of Puttalam, Batticaloa, and Amparai.

Mukkuvars traditionally involved in fishing, conch shell pearl diving, but are also involved in agriculture. They also include the major landlords in the Eastern Province of Sri Lanka who historically also served as mercenaries in medieval era.

== Etymology ==
The name of the caste has several etymology theories. According to one, Mukkuvar derived from Tamil word mukku (means tip or corner) and the suffix ar (people), thus the term denotes "those from tip of the landmass". Another theory states that the word Mukkuvan (singular form), means "diver" derived from the Dravidian word muluku (to immerse or to dive). Other titles used by the community are Kukankulam, Murkukan and Mukkiyar. Their titles Kukankulam (Kukan clan) and Murkukan (foremost Kukan) are literary references to Kukan, the mariner who ferried Hindu god Rama across Ganges from Ayodhya whose descendant they claim.

== History ==
The earliest mention of the Mukkuvar is in the Sinhalese panegyric called Dambadeni asna (13th century AD), mentioning them as soldiers under the army of Parakramabahu II. Their folk origin varies from region to region. According to the legend of the Mukkuvar from Kerala, they emigrated to and from Sri Lanka. The Mattakallappu Manmiyam text and other local palm-leaf manuscripts attribute the emigration of the Sri Lankan Mukkuvar from South India under the rule of Kalinga Magha in 12th century AD, who delegates the power to local petty kings whose successors are identified as belonging to Kukankulam. The conch shell trade flourished in the ancient and medieval era. The Mukkuvars of Jaffna region were traditionally involved in conch shell diving, however took to fishing with the decline of the conch shell trade.

Recent studies show their habits and clan structure, as well as dialects, show affinity towards the Northern Kerala regions. Mukkuvar tribes migrated from Malabar Coast in Kerala to cities in Puttalam and Jaffna in the 12th century. They established a local polity in Puttalam, Mannar, and Jaffna. However, they and the Sonakar were defeated in a three-month siege by the Karaiyar chieftains, sponsored by the Kingdom of Kotte in the 15th century. This event is celebrated in a Sinhalese palm leaf manuscript called the Mukkara Hatana (The Mukkuvar War). The Jaffna chronicle, Yalpana Vaipava Malai, mentions the exile of Mukkuvars from Jaffna Kingdom to Batticaloa during the 15th Century after the invasion of Jaffna by Sampumal Kumarayya.

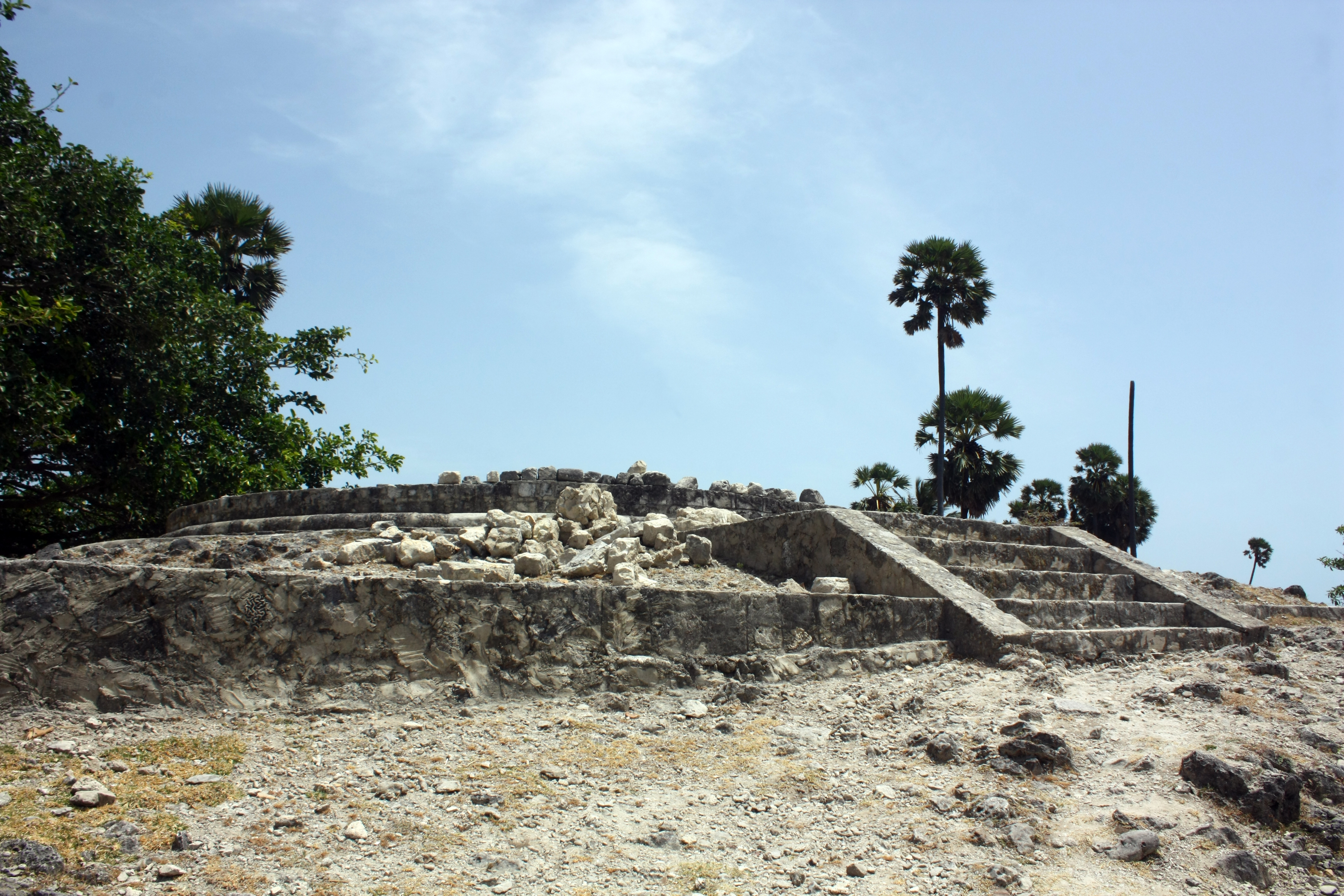
Ruins locally known as Vedi Arasan Kottai i.e. Vedi Arasan's fort.

According to a popular folklore, is the Delft Island linked to the Mukkuvar king Vedi Arasan. Vedi Arasan had forts at Kayts, Kankesanthurai and Keerimalai, and was in possession of a Naga gemstone. The Karaiyar king Meekaman with his Chola army defeated Vedi Arasan and the Moor chief Meera and earned his Naga gemstone for the Chola princess Kannika. Ruins in Delft island such as Meekaman kottai and Vedi Arasan kottai are local names identified with this event.

The Mattakallappu Manmiyam refers to the defeat of the Thimilar by the Mukkuvar and the Sonakar in eastern parts of the island. Several places in Eastern Province bear names related to this event. The theme of the Mukkuvar seeking the aid of Muslim Sonakars was always present and at that time alliances and intermarriage between the communities took place. The Batticaloa region was under the leadership of Mukkuvar Vannimai chiefs.

== Religion ==
One of the earliest tribes to get converted to Catholicism by the Portuguese were the Mukkuvars from Thiruvananthapuram in Kerala. The Mukkuvar in India practising Islam are known Pusalan, Pulasar, Puislam or "New muslims", derived from the Tamil word putiya (new) and Islam. The Mukkuvars of Sri Lanka from North Western Province are mostly Roman Catholic with a strong minority of Muslim Mukkuvars who are known as Sonakars, however they are mostly Hindus in the Northern and Eastern provinces.

== Customs ==
The Mukkuvars of eastern parts of Sri Lanka follow the Mukkuva laws, also known as Mukkuva Ēṟppāṭu, which applies to marriage and property. The Mukkuvars in Eastern Sri Lanka are, like other castes, also divided into kudi's (matrilineal clans). According the study conducted by McGilvray, Kudi system of Mukkuvars and Eastern Muslims has greater resemblances to Northern Kerala Nayars, Tiyyars, and Mappillas.

== See also ==
- Caste in Sri Lanka
- History of Eastern Tamils
- Seerpadar
