= History of Eastern Tamils =

History of Eastern Tamils of Sri Lanka is informed by local legends, native literature and other colonial documents. Sri Lankan Tamils are subdivided based on their cultural, dialects & other practices as into Northern, Eastern and Western groups. Eastern Tamils inhabit a region that is divided into Trincomalee District, Batticalo District and Ampara District.

== Early settlements ==
Evidence of a settlement of people with burial practices similar to that found in the Tamil Nadu region in India and further North was excavated at megalithic burial sites at Pomparippu in the western coast and in Kathiraveli in the eastern coast. These are dated between the 2nd century BC and 2nd century AD.

Although it is not known when ethnic Tamils first settled in Sri Lanka, early settlements occurred in the aftermath of repeated South Indian invasions (c. 1st to 13th centuries.). Tamil royal dynasties in this period are known to have patronized Tamil Saivite culture in the east that paralleled the growth of the community in the area, and by the 6th century, a special coastal route by boat was functioning to the Koneswaram temple of Trincomalee and Thirukkovil temple of Batticaloa. It was not until the 13th century that there was firm evidence of the rise of a significant Tamil Hindu kingdom in the Jaffna Peninsula, complete with a Hindu king and a palace, in the aftermath of the collapse of the classical Sinhala Dry Zone civilisations. By the 11th and 12th centuries, the upper half of the eastern province had a large Tamil community.

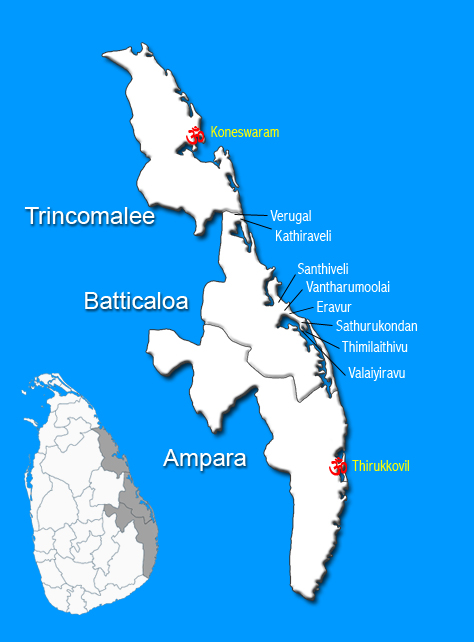
Historical Tamil settlements in the East.Tamils and the Tamil-speaking Muslim community formed the majority of the province prior to the Independence of the island

Eastern Tamils had feudal organizations that centered around Ur Podiyar at a village level and the Kudi system that controlled social interactions. They also were organized politically as Vannimai chiefs who came nominally under the Kandyan kingdom. The most important social group were the Mukkuvar who had originated from South India and had repeatedly invaded Sri Lanka as evidenced by Sinhalese literature of that period called Kokila Sandeśa as the Mukkara Hatana. One of the local traditions that records the landing and settling of eastern Sri Lanka is called Mattakallappu Manmiam (Tamil:மட்டக்களப்பு மான்மியம்).

== Local sources ==
Mattakallappu Manmiyam in reality is the story from a Mukkuva perspective of their settlement of Batticaloa District, although not all Tamils of the east are Mukkuvas. It also explains etymology of place names from a Mukkuva perspective and combines legends with historical facts. From the study of the language used, it is evident that it is a compilation of works written by number of authors over a long period of time.

According Manmiam Mukkuvars came from the Pandya Kingdom in present days Tamil Nadu state in India. After arriving in the east they had established seven nuclear villages. Once established they came into conflict with another fishing related caste called Thimilar. Thimilar are found in the east as well as the north of the country. Their primary settlement was called Thimilathivu, where according to Manmiam there was a fort. They also had settled in a lucrative fishing settlement called Valaikattiravu where the place where Thimilar caught large amounts of fish using fishing nets. (Valai(வலை) in Tamil) means a net). Manmiam narrates that how Fishing related conflicts eventually became a mini holocaust for the Thimilar.

With the help of another group of people who came to Batticaloa from India called Pattaniar who are believed to be Muslim traders from South India, for business they defeated the Thimilar and chased them away to Verugal which is a boundary village of between Batticaloa and Trincomalee districts.

The name of some villages are seemed to be the monuments of this war. A village near the modern Batticaloa town called Sathurukondan which in Tamil means a place where enemies were killed. A place where the warriors who chased after the retreating Thimilar came back with victory and met together called Santhiwelli. A place where warriors rested and celebrated the victory was called Vanthaarumoolai where the Eastern University of Sri Lanka is located today.

The place where the Mukkuvar settled the Muslims who assisted them to prevent the Thimilar from returning is called Eravoor (derived from Erathu= prevent re-immigrant Oor=place or village) which is today a Muslim majority town within the Batticalo district.

Present-day Distribution of Sri Lankan Tamils throughout the Island including the eastern province in Trincomalee (34.3%), Batticaloa (70.8)and Ampara districts (18.4%)

Other social groups such as Vellalar have their own caste legends as to how they came to settle the east. Vellalar consider themselves to be the descendants of soldiers of Kalinga Magha (reigned 1215 - 1236), who invaded Sri Lanka. Curiously he was also considered to be instrumental in creating the Jaffna Kingdom in the North according to Yalpana Vaipava Malai and other scholars. Magha was an invader from present day Orissa state in India who recruited his soldiers from South India. His invasion is credited by Sri Lankan literature as one of the main causes for the failure of the classical Sinhala Dry Zone civilisations.

Other social group called Seerpadar have been a minority, their conservative worldview has prevailed among the Vellala and similar castes.

== Multiple origins ==
From traditional and legendary sources, it can be ascertained that the immigrants who created the first Tamil settlements in Sri Lanka in general and the east in particular appear to have come not just from the Tamil Nadu region of south India, but from the Kerala coast as well.

== See also ==
- Batticaloa Territory
- Mattakallappu Manmiyam
