= Karava heraldry =

Karava Heraldry includes a large number of Karava flags that have survived the ravages of time. Many are illustrated in E. W. Perera's monumental book titled 'Sinhalese Banners and Standards'.

== The Symbols ==
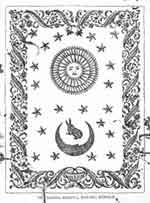
The Karava Sun and Moon Flag symbolizing the Solar and Lunar Dynasty origins of the community. This flag is also one of the main flags still used by the Karavas at their ceremonies and is another flag referred to in the Mukkara Hatana as granted to the Karavas by King Parakramabahu IV. However the Mahabharata states that the epic Kauravas from whom the Karavas claim descent used flags with the sun, moon and stars in the great Mahabharata war.

The ancestral flag of the Karava community

The ancestral insignia of the Karava community from a 19th-century illustration

== The Makara ==
Beknopte History, 1688 describes a white flag charged with a red flag hoisted on royal ships (JRASCB XI No.38 106 & 109). And in the words of Valentine Francois, the 18th century Dutch Historian, “the Karawas displayed a white flag with the device of a particular fish in the centre".

The Makara, is a composite dragon with a curious mythical structure. It symbolizes the house of Capricorn in the Zodiac to which it has given its name Makara in the Hindu calendar. It has the head of a crocodile, horns of a goat, the body of an antelope and a snake, the tail of a fish and feet of a panther. Makara is half animal half fish and it is sometimes described as having the head of an elephant and the body of a fish. It is generally large and regarded as living in the ocean rather than in lakes or streams.

Only Varuna, the spiritual ruler of the world has power over the Makara. It is Varuna's vehicle in Hindu mythology. The Varunakulasuriya clan is the largest of the Karava clans in southern Sri Lanka. The symbolism is extremely interesting. In mythology Varuna is the chief of the Adithyas. Remnants of the name Adithya from the medieval period can still be found in Karava family names. As Adithya is a synonym for Suriya (i.e. the Sun). the Karava clan Varunakulasuriya too signifies Varuna-Adithya.

The Kokila Sandesha poem from the Kotte period refers to the Makara flag as follows:

Punsanda surindu sanda salakuna adina vara
Ban sonda telitudew tele tudeni mana hara
Min dada jaya virudu nada karana piya kara
An koda mediya tura topa sarivana pavara

The ancestral White Elephant flag of the Karavas

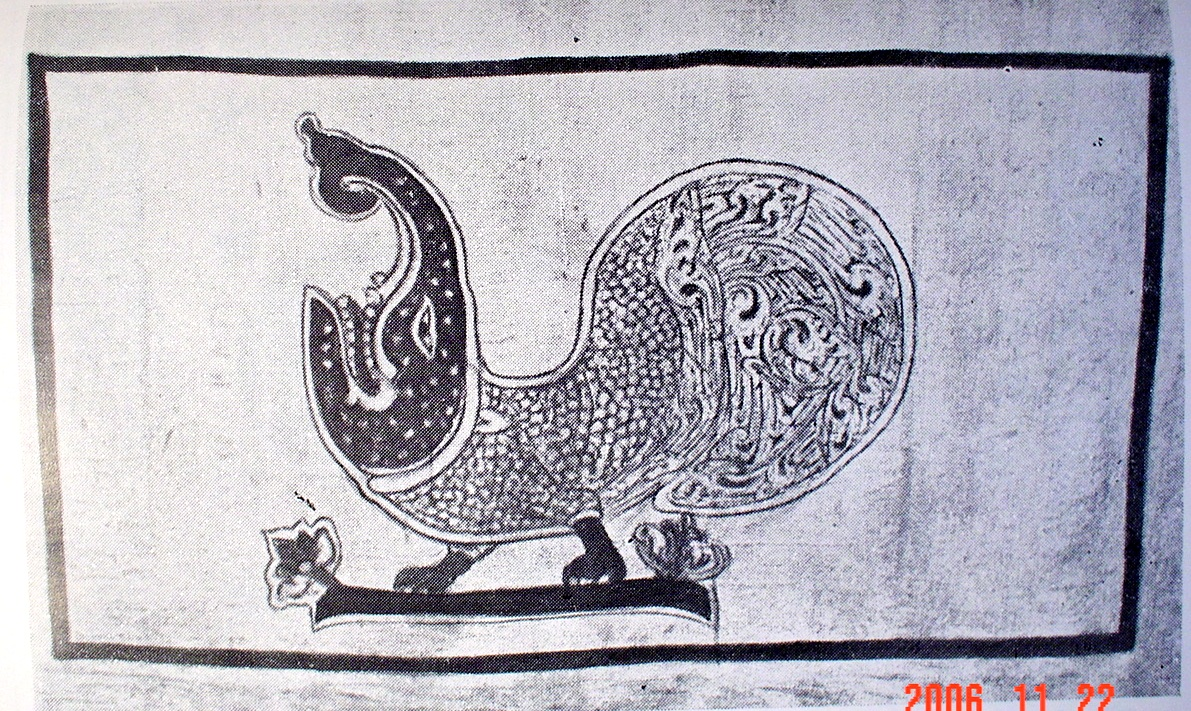
A 19th century representation of the Karava Makara Flag. The image of the mythical creature Makara is extensively used in ancient Sri Lankan royal architecture. This flag is one of the main flags still used by the Karavas at their ceremonies. The Mukkara Hatana, an ola leaf manuscript now in the British Museum states that King Parakramabahu IV granted it to the Karavas

A Centuries old Makara flag of the Karava community

The Garuda flag of the Karava from Tamankaduwa. Verse 151 of the Thisara Sandesha from the Kotte period refers to the Garuda flag as a royal flag

The ancestral Simha flag of the Karavas

A 17th century Catholic flag of the Karavas. For a clear copy of the flag see

The funeral procession on 23 August 1612 of prince Mahasthana, son of Maha Patabendige Dona Catherina, sole heiress of the kingdom of Sri Lanka. Note the use of flags and other insignia as done by the Karavas todate

See Fish and ship symbols of Sri Lanka for the significance of the Fish and Ship symbols on these flags.

== The Elephant ==
The recurrent Elephant symbol may be from the Mahabharata, Hastinapura which means Elephant city, the capital of the Kaurava kingdom. The great war of the epic Mahabharata is fought over the throne of this city and most incidents in the epic take place in this city. The Sri Lankan chronicle Rajavaliya states that the elephant flag was prominent in Mayadunne's son, prince Rajasinghe's battle at Mulleriyawa against the Portuguese.

The battle flag of Sri Lanka, captured by the British from Sri Wikrama Rajasinghe's army. It displays the kettle drum which was beaten before battles and five weapons (panchaudha). In the past, a medallion with panchaudha symbols used to be tied on Karava infants for protection. The practice still survives in rural Sri Lanka and has been now adopted by other communities as well.

A Patangatim's wife's tombstone from 1691. It bears the Karava insignia: Pearl umbrella, Palm tree, caparisoned Elephant and Fish symbol Click image to enlarge.

The tombstone of Patangatim Francisco Piris' wife from St. Thomas Church, Jinthupitiya illustrated here, shows that the Karava heraldic symbols: Pearl umbrella, Palm tree, caparisoned Elephant and Fish symbol were used even on tombstones (JRASCB XXII 387)

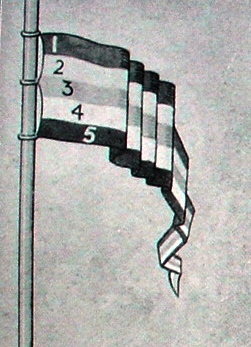
The flag of the Karava 'Thakura Arta-deva Adithya' clan from 20th century impressions of Ceylon. The colors of the stripes are blue, gold, red, white and purple.

== The White shield ==
The white shields known as sak paliha or conch shields were also important royal symbols in Sri Lanka's history. The Karava ancestral flag illustrated above displays two of them. The sak paliha was a white shield sometimes with the devise of a conch shell on it and is referred to frequently as a royal symbol in Sinhalese historical texts. According to the Portuguese historian De Couto, it was also used as a royal symbol ( JRASCB XX 187 ).

== Usage by kin-groups in India ==
Across the Palk Strait, the kinsmen of the Karavas too have used similar insignia in the past. H. R. Pate describes a wedding as follows: A peculiar feature of the wedding is the procession to the bride's house with virudus or banners supposed to be the insignia of the Kingly ancestors of the race. The emblems consist of 21 flags embroidered with representations of various objects, animate and inanimate, such as a Snake, a Peacock, a Palmyra, a Chank, the Sun and Moon an Elephant. A Fish and so on. In addition to these a large Umbrella, a Shield and other trappings are carried. The bridegroom wears a costume called KAPA resembling the state robes of Jathi Thalavi More and white cloths are spread before hi in his path. (Madras District Gazetteer 123 & 124)

== The Chandra Kula Maalawa ==
An old document called the 'Chandrakula Malawa' from the Pitigal Korale enumerates the following 21 flags as belonging to the Kurukula:

- Naga Kodiya (Cobra flag)
- Kukulu Kodiya (Cock flag)
- Monara Kodiya (Peacock flag)
- Talgaha bendi Kodiya (Talipot palm flag)
- Newa bendi Kodiya (Ship flag)
- Hakgediya bendi Kodiya (Chank flag)
- Sippiya Kodiya (Sea shell flag)
- Kotiya bendi Kodiya (Leopard flag)
- Sinhaya bendi Kodiya (Lion flag)
- Rajaliya bendi Kodiya (Eagle flag)
- Hansaya bendi Kodiya (Swan flag)
- Tanmetta bendi Kodiya (Kettle drum flag)
- Surya Kodiya (Sun flag)
- Chandrabendi Kodiya (Moon flag)
- Etha bendi Kodiya (Elephant flag)
- Gona bendi Kodiya (Bull flag)
- Makaraya bendi Kodiya (Makara flag)
- Thel Kodiya (Net flag)
- Matsaya Kodiya (Fish flag)
- Hanumantha Kodiya (Hanuma flag)
- Girava bendi Kodiya (Parrot flag)

(Perera 34, Kurukula Charitaya II 26)

== See also ==
- Timeline of the Karavas
- Flag of Sri Lanka
