= Vadugar =

Vatuka is a given name. Notable people with the name include:

- Vatuka of Anuradhapura, King of Anuradhapura
- Vatuka of Southern India

== See also ==
- Vaduge
