= 1990 Batticaloa massacre =

Killing of Tamil refugees by the Sri Lankan Army

Batticaloa massacre or Sathurukondan massacre
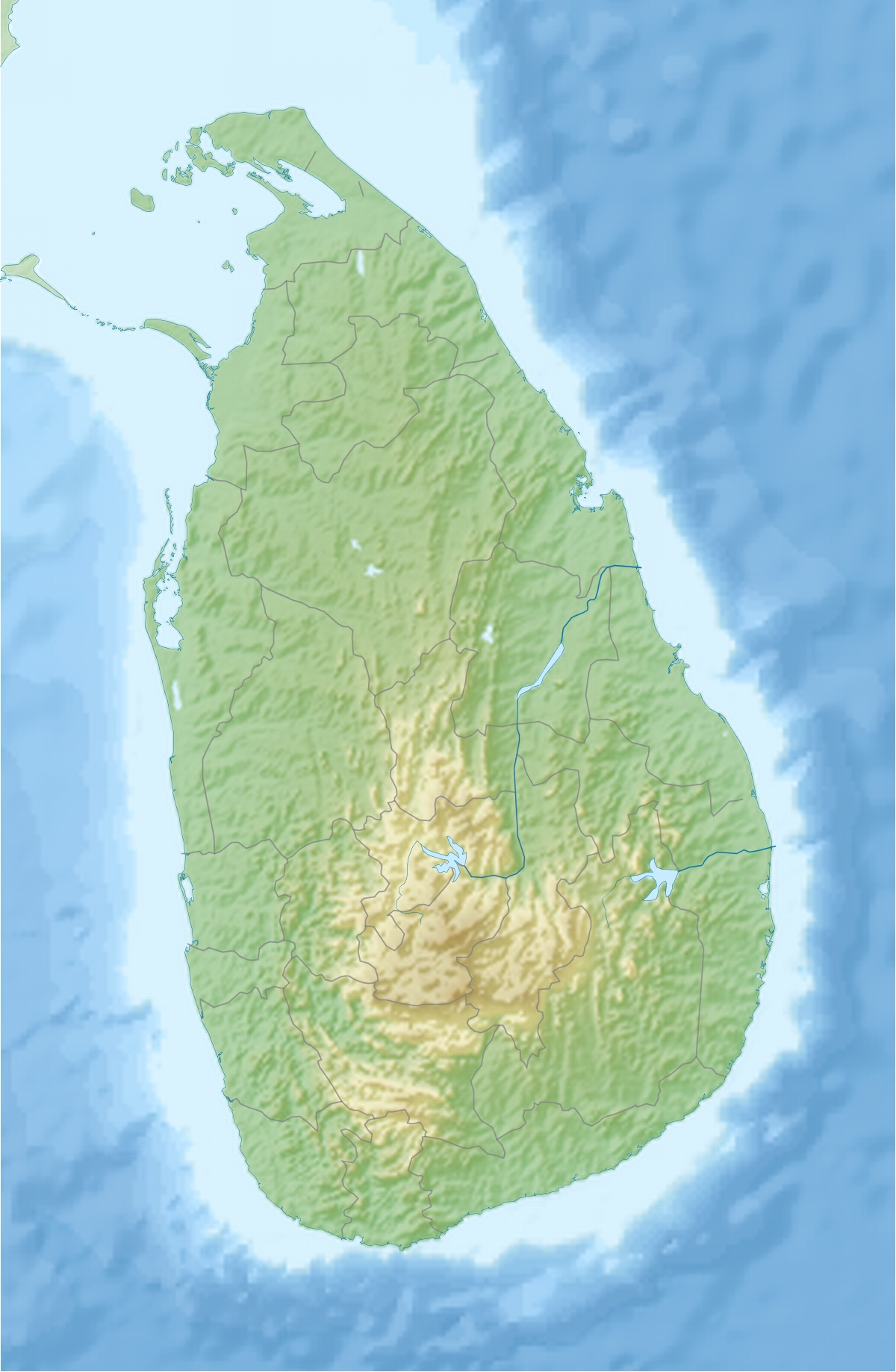
- Location: 7°42′58″N 81°42′0″E; Batticaloa, Sri Lanka
- Date: September 9, 1990; 36 years ago (+6 GMT)
- Target: Sri Lankan Tamil civilians
- Attack type: Cutting, Burning
- Weapons: Swords, Knives
- Deaths: 184
- Injuries: 1
- Perpetrator: Sri Lankan Army

The 1990 Batticaloa massacre, also known as the Sathurukondan massacre (Tamil: சத்துருக்கொண்டான் படுகொலை), was a massacre of at least 184 minority Sri Lankan Tamil refugees, including infants, from three villages in the Batticaloa District by the Sri Lankan Army on September 9, 1990. Although the government instituted two investigations, no one was ever charged.

== Background information ==
By 1946, 33% of clerical jobs in Ceylon were held by Sri Lankan Tamils, although they were 11% of the country's population. This was partly due to the availability of Western-style education provided by the Protestant American Ceylon Mission, Hindu revivalists, and local Catholic missions in the Tamil-dominated Jaffna Peninsula. After gaining independence from Britain in 1948, Sinhalese politicians made the over-representation a political issue. They initiated measures aimed at correcting the over-representation by establishing ethnic quotas for university entrants.

These measures, and a series of riots and pogroms starting from 1956 that targeted Sri Lankan Tamils and the resultant mass murder, displacements and refugees, led to the formation of rebel groups advocating independence for Sri Lankan Tamils. After the 1983 Black July pogrom, full-scale civil war erupted between the government and the rebel groups.

During the course of the civil war there were a number of massacres of civilians, war rapes, torture and enforced disappearances attributed to both the government and allied groups as well as the various rebel formations.

== The massacre ==
The village of Sathurukondan lies just beyond Iruthayapuram, the northern suburb of Batticaloa. At 5:30 p.m. on September 9, 1990, armed men in uniform and in civilian clothes came into the area and ordered everyone to come on to the road. They were then marched to the army camp in the vicinity after being told that they would be questioned and released. Most of those who were left in the village that day were elderly, women and the very young.

According to the only survivor, Kanthasamy Krishnakumar (21), in a recording made before leading citizens in Batticaloa:

Fifty commandos walked about 150 of us to the Saturukondan army camp, which we reached about 7.00 or 8.00 p.m. Four were separated from the rest, attacked with swords and kris knives and were pulled away out of the camp. All were then taken to one place, attacked and burnt with tyres.

Krishnakumar who was injured, managed to roll out of sight in the semi-darkness, crept away to a house and asked for water. He then went to his village and stayed in an empty house, and later found his way to his cousin's in Batticaloa town.

The list of victims totaled 184 (38 Sathurukondan, 47 Kokuvil, 37 Panniachchiady and 62 Pillayarady). Of this number, there were 47 children below the age of 10 and several women.

== Government investigation ==
Retired judge K. Palakidnar of the Special Presidential Commission of inquiry appointed by the People's Alliance government described the massacre in detail in his final report. According to the report of the commission of inquiry, 5 infants, 42 children under ten, 85 women and 28 old persons were among the 184 villagers who were murdered. The judge also identified three captains of the Sri Lankan Army: Warnakulasooriya, Herath and Wijenaike as the responsible parties.

The judge in his report urged the Sri Lankan President that there is strong evidence for the massacre and that legal action should be taken against the perpetrators. Although indictment levelled against alleged miscreants by the Human Rights Task Force, no action has been taken against the alleged perpetrators. Within the Batticaloa district, during the late 1980s and early 1990s a total of 1,100 civilians disappeared, assumed killed.
