= Batticaloa (disambiguation) =

Batticaloa is a city in Sri Lanka.

Batticaloa may also refer to:

- Batticaloa District, a district in Sri Lanka
- Batticaloa region, the ancient region of Tamil settlements in Sri Lanka
- Batticaloa Electoral District
  - Batticaloa Electoral District (1947–1989)

== See also ==
- Batticaloa Lagoon, a large lagoon in Eastern Province, Sri Lanka
- Eastern University, Sri Lanka, preceded by the Batticaloa University College
- History of Eastern Tamils
