= Karava =

Maritime martial Sinhalese caste in Sri Lanka

Karava of Sri Lanka
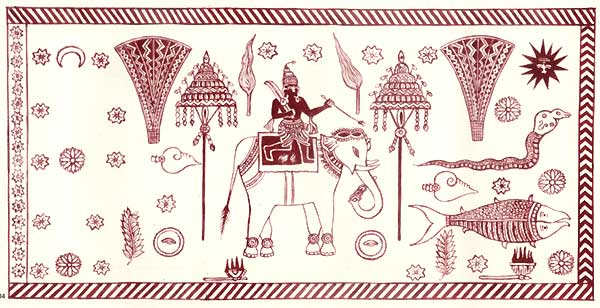
- The Karava Maha Kodiya of the Karava Community.

Regions with significant populations
- Sri Lanka,

Languages
- Sinhala (Tamil also spoken by bilingual Karavas north of Negombo.)

Religion
- Significant Majority: Theravada Buddhism, Minority: Roman Catholicism, Protestantism

Related ethnic groups
- Sinhalese, Tamils, Karaiyar, Pattanavar

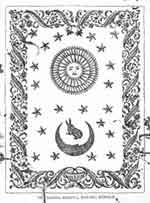
The Karava Sun and Moon Flag symbolising the Royal Solar and Lunar Dynastical origins of the community. This flag is also one of the main flags still used by the Karavas at their ceremonies.

Karava (Sinhala: කරාවා, romanized: Karāvā) is a Sinhalese caste of Sri Lanka, whose ancestors migrated throughout history from the adjacent Coromandel coast, claiming lineage to the Kaurava royalty of the old Kingdom of Kuru in Northern India. The Tamil equivalent is Karaiyar. Both groups are also known as the Kurukula (Kuru clan). Epigraphic evidence as well as the Janawamsaya, indicate some of the migration to the early historical era (though archaeology points to maritime links between the Island and the Coromandel coast from the protohistoric era). Like the other coastal castes such as the Duravas and Salagamas, the majority of Karava migration to Sri Lanka happened between the 13th to 18th century from South India and are of historical Dravidian ethnic origin.

The last mass migration to Sri Lanka happened in the 15th century from Tamil Nadu to fight against the Mukkuvar confederation as mentioned in the Mukkara Hatana. They have also given great importance to trade and commerce. The elite families are involved in entrepreneurial activities including the development of plantation agriculture such as coconut, tea and rubber. They also played a leading role in advocating constitutional reforms and socialism prior to independence as well as in the emergence of Sinhala Buddhist nationalism in post-independent Sri Lanka. It is estimated that they form 10% of the Sinhalese population.

== Etymology ==
The origins of the term Karava are still debated. The name might have derived from the Tamil Karaiyar, where "Karava" has the same root word kara or karai meaning "coast" or "shore" in Tamil. The earliest recorded instance could be the Prakrit inscription at the Abhayagiri Vihāra dating from the 1st century BC denoting a Dameda karava navika which means Tamil Karava mariner. The name "Karava" has also been proposed to be a corruption of the Sanskrit name Kaurava, following their origin story. According to the Janavamsaya, one of the oldest treatises about Sinhalese castes (dated to the 15th century), the term originates from Prince Karavanti, a descendant of the mythical king Upasāgara who accompanied the overseas voyage of Prince Vijaya, the legendary king of Tambapanni. Other historical counts refer to them and also the Karaiyars as Careas and Kaurawar.

== History ==
Many Kurukula communities throughout Sri Lanka and south India claim an origin from the Kuru kingdom and the Kauravas of the Hindu epic Mahabharata. For instance, Kurukulattaraiyan was the name ascribed to 'the prince who wore a golden anklet' that commanded the army of Vijayabahu I (11th century AD) to end Chola rule in Sri Lanka.

Apart from the Janavamsaya and inscriptions, studies on the establishment of the caste system in Sinhalese society tend to show that the history of the Karava caste may not go beyond the Kotte period (15th–16th century AD). However, typically only four castes were mentioned prior to this era and migrants were usually mentioned by their ethnicity. Historical manuscripts such as the Mukkara Hatana indicate that there were migrations from the Kurumandalam coast of Tamil Nadu, South India, and that they were previously Tamil speakers. Oral traditions of some Karava families suggest that they migrated from South India as recently as the 18th century. Nevertheless, recent migrants are known to have been incorporated by several castes, including the majority caste group. The Karavas north of Negombo are predominantly Catholic and bilingual in Tamil and Sinhalese, whereas the Karavas south of Colombo are Buddhist. It is evident that they had also patronised Mahayana Buddhism before its extinction in the Island.

The Mukkara Hatana describes that they won a three month siege against the Mukkuvars, under the sponsorship of Kotte king Parakramabahu VI in the 15th century AD. The Kotte King Bhuvanaikabahu VI was the son of a Karava chief who was adopted by Parakramabahu VI after the death of his father in the war mentioned in Mukkara Hatana. The Rajavaliya mentions that in the 16th century, the heirs to the throne - Bhuvanaikabahu and Pararajasinghe were under the care of the minister Karunadhipati, the Patabenda of Yapa-Patuna.

The Karava chieftains resisted the colonial Portuguese rule in 16th century. The Karava Prince of Uva, Kuruvita Rala (also known as Antonio Barreto), who had his strongholds in Batticaloa, Wellawaya, Negombo and parts of Sabaragamuwa and Matara region, led his and the troops of Sitawaka Kingdom and revolted against the Portuguese. Kuruvita Rala also raided the Kandy Kingdom and drove king Senarat of Kandy out of his capital.

They were under Portuguese rule, along with the Karaiyar and Nair recruited as Lascarins and were converted to Catholicism. Large Catholic Karava communities exists ever since, who were mostly Hindus prior to conversion. The Catholic Karava chieftains sided with the Kingdom of Kandy and the kingdom's Dutch allies against the Portuguese empire, and the King bestowed honors and titles to the Karava chieftains.

The Karavas amassed wealth through commercial ventures such as in coastal navigation, fishing, carpentry, transportation, arrack, coconut, rubber, graphite and other industries. The Karavas formed the elites between 16th century and early 20th century. Numerous organization were formed by them such as Ceylon National Association, one of the predecessors of the Ceylon National Congress. James Peiris, a Karava lawyer and national leader, was an essential character in the Sri Lankan independence movement. Rohana Wijeweera and other Karava leaders formed in the 1960s the Janatha Vimukthi Peramuna, a communist party and political movement, who were involved in two armed uprisings against the ruling governments in 1971 and 1987.

== Traditional status ==
The Karavas were coastal people and as such, skilled fisherman, sailors, boat builders, merchants, engaged in rudimentary agriculture and the production of salt, who served in naval warfare and contributed as coastal chieftains and regional kings. Their chiefs were referred in Sinhalese as Patabendi or Patangatim, which means the ones who wore the "Nala pata" the traditional grament worn on head by royal karavas. Tamil term Pattamkattiyar (meaning "crowned one"), which was also used by their equivalent Tamil Karaiyars.

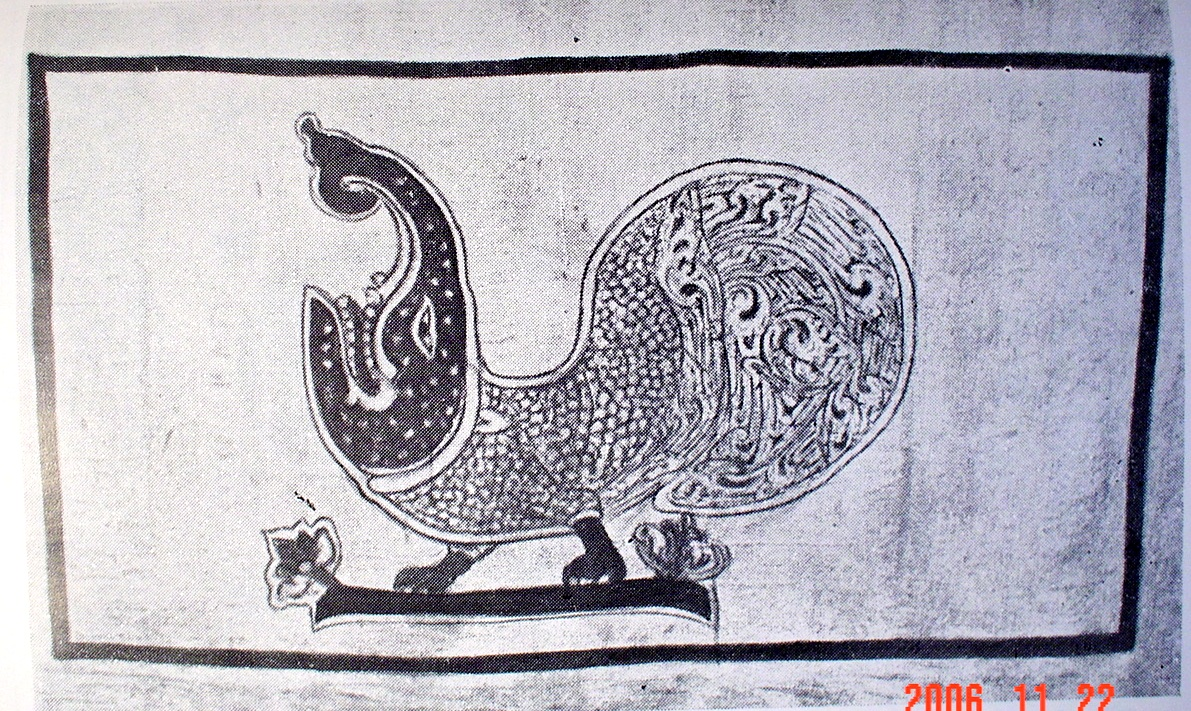
A 19th-century representation of the Karava Makara Flag.

The Karavas were one of the few Sri Lankan communities traditionally entitled to use flags. A large number of these Karava flags have survived the ravages of time and many are illustrated in E. W. Perera's book Sinhalese Banners and Standards.

The sacred usage of conch shell and tying of Nalapata (royal forehead plate) was a common practice among Karavas, also mentioned in the Rajaveliya. The sun and the moon, pearl umbrella are traditional royal symbols used by the Karavas. The Makara, being an emblem of their clan, is the mount of their clan deity, the sea god Varuna. The clan name Warnakulasuriya, denotes their deity Varuna.

Insignia such as the pearl umbrella, flags, swords, trident, yak tail whisks, lighted flame torches and drums were previously widely used by the Karavas at their weddings and funerals. By the 1960s, such usage has been greatly reduced, whereas some places is it still practiced.

== Ancestral names ==
The Karava's use the vasagama naming system. Vasagama, literally meaning "estate (gama) in which one resides", is a title or surname that is given to the patrilineal descendants. The most common clans among the Karavas are Kurukulasuriya, Warunakulasuriya and Mihindikulasuriya (formerly known as Arasakulasuriya). Other clans are Koon Karavas and Konda Karavas.

Name based on leadership include Arsanilatta (Royal authority), Aditya (Suryawanshi), Sellaperumage (minor prince), Illaperuma (local prince), Hennadige/Senadhige (house of the Commander) and Hewage (house of the soilder), show a traditional military heritage of the group. Some of the popular surnames, Beminahennedige, Wachchi Hennadige, Weera Hennadige, Andra Hennadige and Warusa Hennadige, Gardiya Hewage, Hewa Paththini, Arasa Marakkalage ("house of the Royal Mariners"), Patabendige (port chief / local headmen), and Thantrige (also Tantulage or Thanthulage, "house of experts").

Names based on profession include Hettige and Hettiakandage (house of the merchant), Marakkalage (house of the ship/boat owners or sailors ), Mestrige (master carpenter), Gallappthi (joiner in boat-building), Malimage (sailor) and Vaduge (also Baduge; house of carpenters, ship, Silmaguruge & boat builders, also descendant of Vadugar).

== See also ==
- Caste in Sri Lanka
- Bharatakula
- Negombo Tamils
- Kastane
