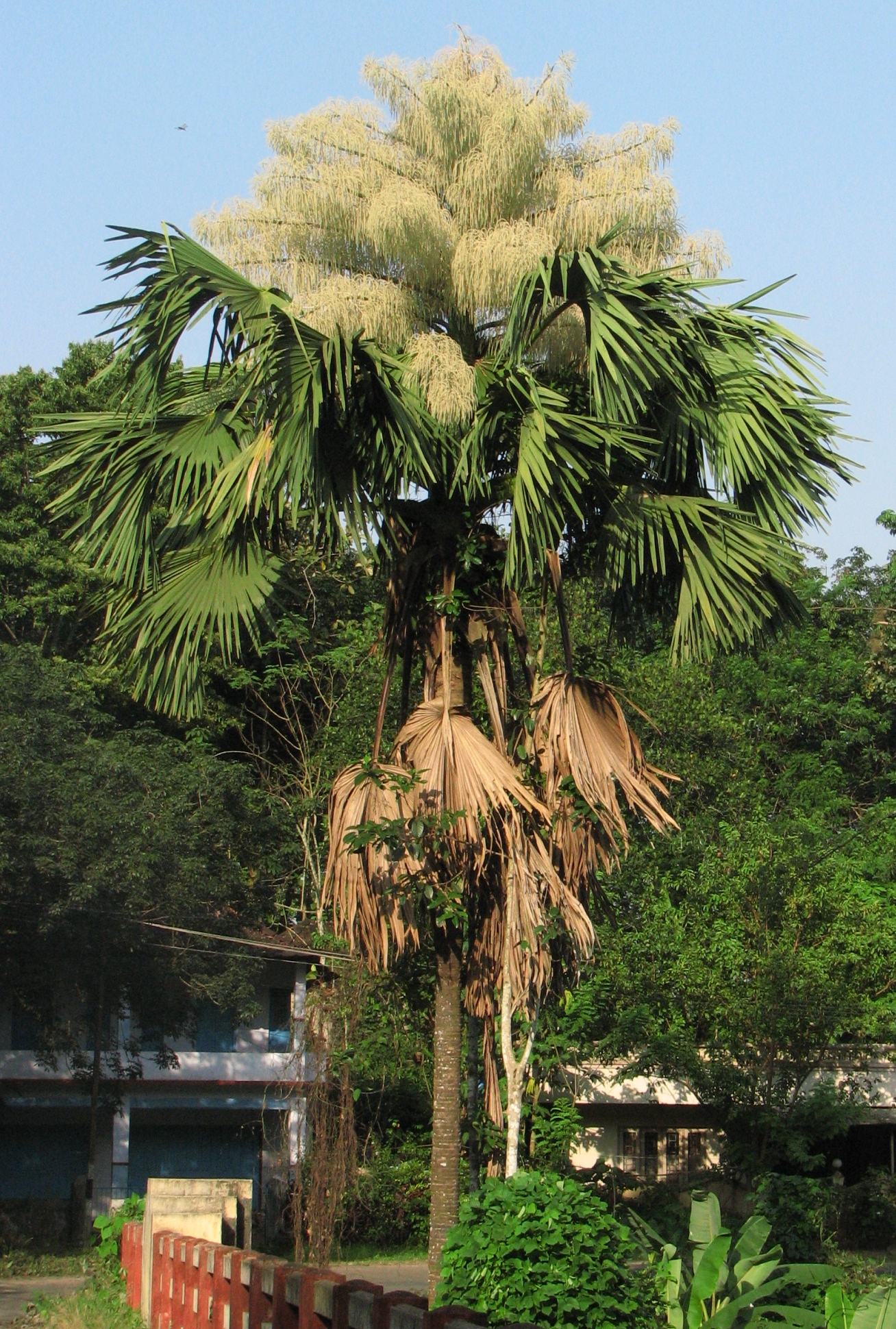
- Talipot palm flowering at Kerala, India

Conservation status
- Data Deficient (IUCN 2.3)

Scientific classification
- Kingdom: Plantae
- Clade: Tracheophytes
- Clade: Angiosperms
- Clade: Monocots
- Clade: Commelinids
- Order: Arecales
- Family: Arecaceae
- Genus: Corypha
- Species: C. umbraculifera

Binomial name
- Corypha umbraculifera L.

Synonyms
- Bessia sanguinolenta Raf.; Corypha guineensis L.

= Corypha umbraculifera =

Talipot palm

Species of palm

Corypha umbraculifera, the talipot palm, is a species of palm native to eastern and southern India and Sri Lanka. It is also grown in Cambodia, Myanmar, Thailand, Mauritius and the Andaman Islands. It is one of the five accepted species in the genus Corypha. It is a flowering plant with the largest inflorescence in the world. It lives up to 60 years before bearing flowers and fruits. It dies shortly after.

== Description ==
It is one of the largest palms with individual specimens having reached heights of up to 25 m (82 ft) with stems up to 1.3 m (4.3 ft) in diameter. It is a fan palm (Arecaceae tribe Corypheae), with large, palmate leaves up to 5 m (16 ft) in diameter, with a petiole up to 4 m (13 ft), and up to 130 leaflets.

The talipot palm bears the largest inflorescence of any plant, 6–8 m (20–26 ft) long, consisting of one to several million small flowers borne on a branched stalk that forms at the top of the trunk (the titan arum, Amorphophallus titanum, from the family Araceae, has the largest unbranched inflorescence, and the species Rafflesia arnoldii has the world's largest single flower). The talipot palm is monocarpic, flowering only once, when it is 30 to 80 years old. It takes about a year for the fruit to mature, producing thousands of round, yellow-green fruit 3–4 cm (1–1.5 in) in diameter, each containing a single seed. The plant dies after fruiting.

== Distribution ==
The talipot palm is cultivated in South India and Sri Lanka. It is also cultivated in Southeast Asian countries of Cambodia, Myanmar, Thailand and the Andaman Islands. It is also grown sparsely in China.

== Uses ==
Historically, the leaves were written upon in various South Asian and South-East Asian cultures using an iron stylus to create palm leaf manuscripts. In the Philippines, it is locally known as buri or buli. The leaves are also used for thatching, and the sap is tapped to make palm wine. In South India, the palm leaves are used to make umbrellas for agricultural workers. The tree is known as kudapana (കുടപ്പന) in Malayalam, talo (/tɑːloʊ/, ତାଳ) in Odia, sreetalam (శ్రీతాళం) in Telugu and kudaipanai (குடைப்பனை) in Tamil, which means umbrella palm. The plant is known as tala (තල) in Sri Lanka, by local Sinhalese people.

In Cambodia, the palm is known as tréang (it was also known by the French name latanier), and as noted above was extensively used in the past to write religious manuscripts. In recent times the leaf media has been used by traditional healers and soothsayers. The mature leaves are used to make thatches, mats and hats. The petioles can be used in the manufacture of canes, arrows and netting needles. At low tide, fishers use the fruit to stupefy fish.

== Gallery ==
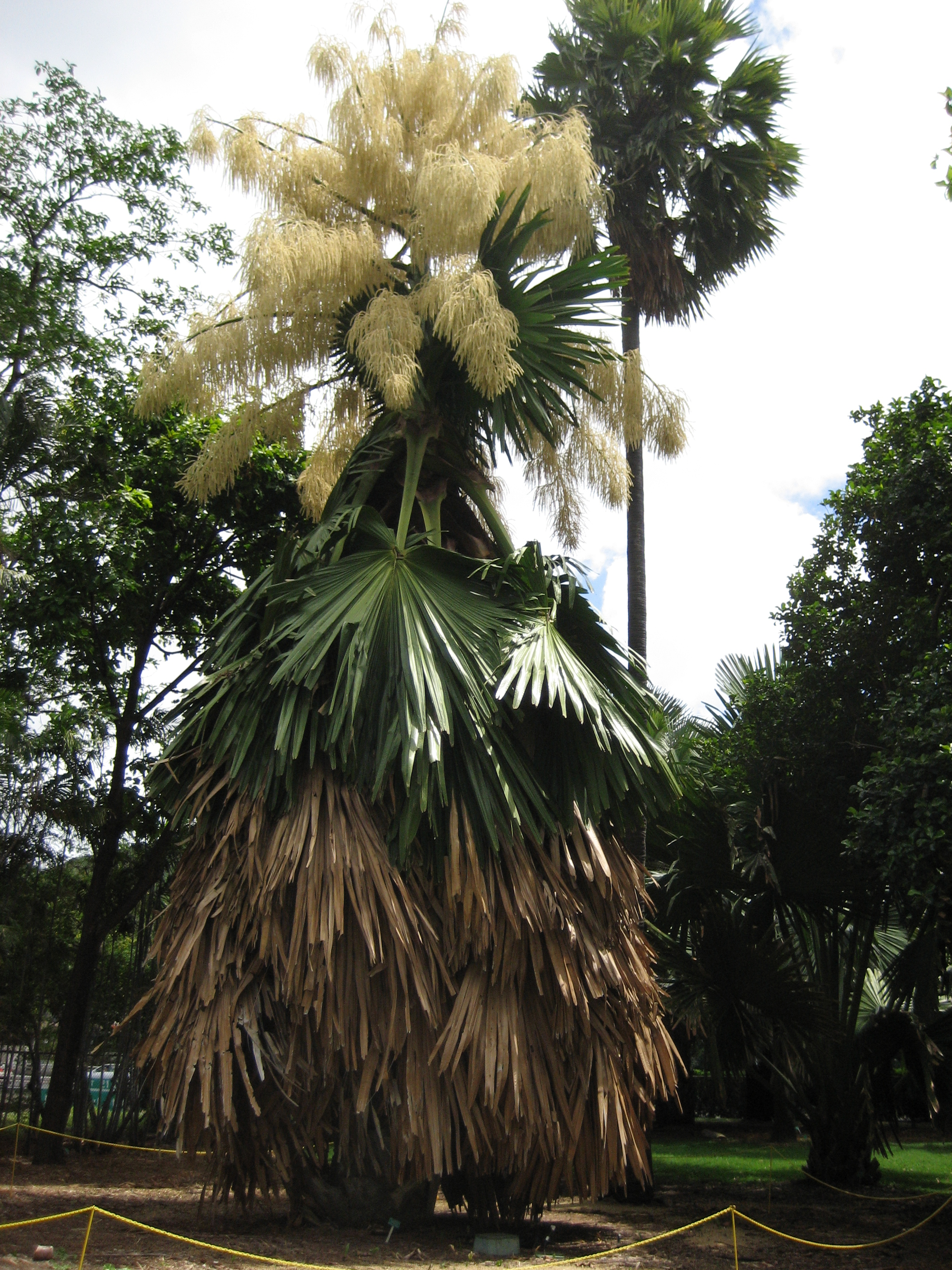
At Foster Botanical Garden, Honolulu, Hawaii

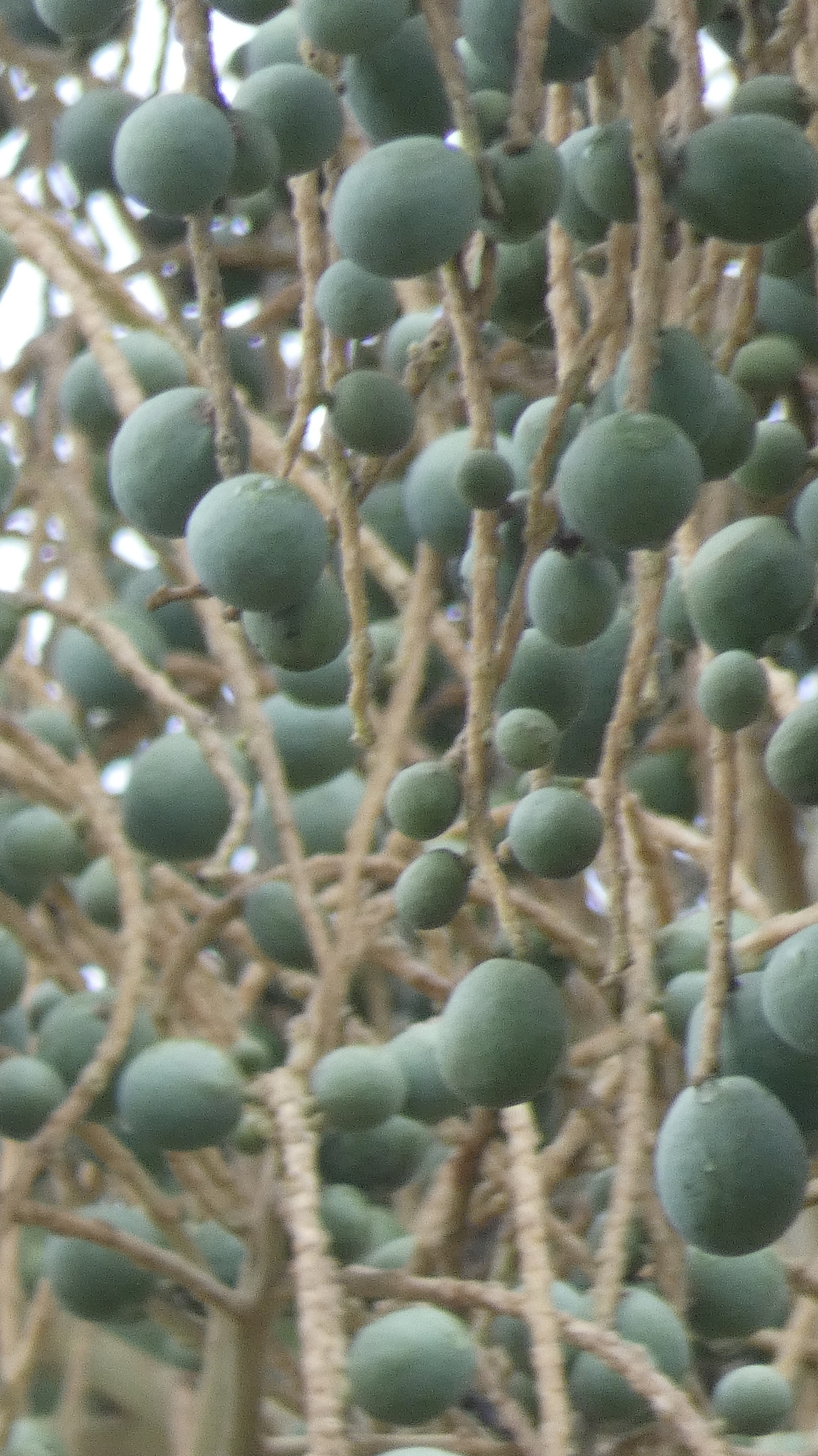
Talipot palm fruit

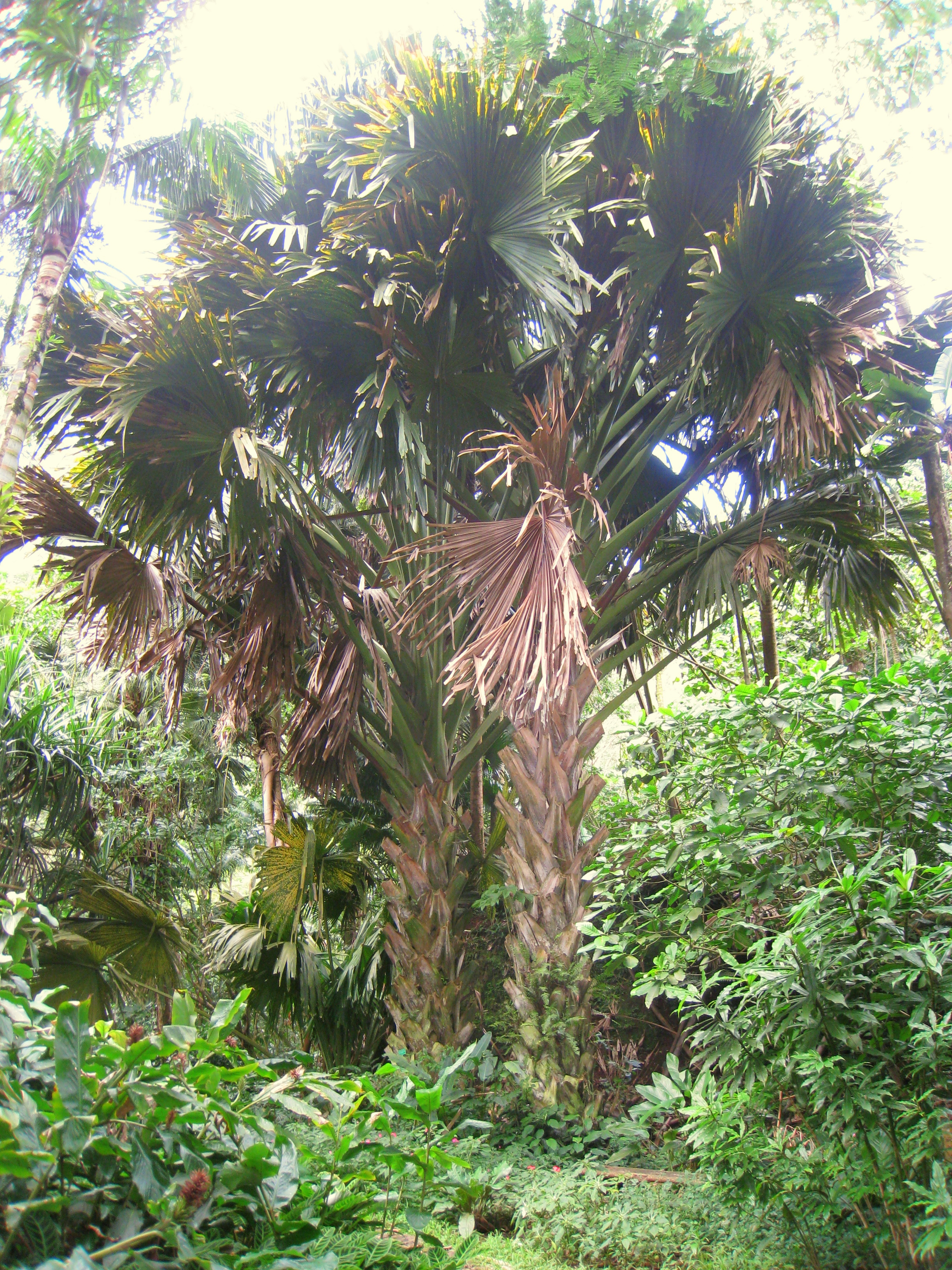
At Lyon Arboretum, Hawaii, U.S.

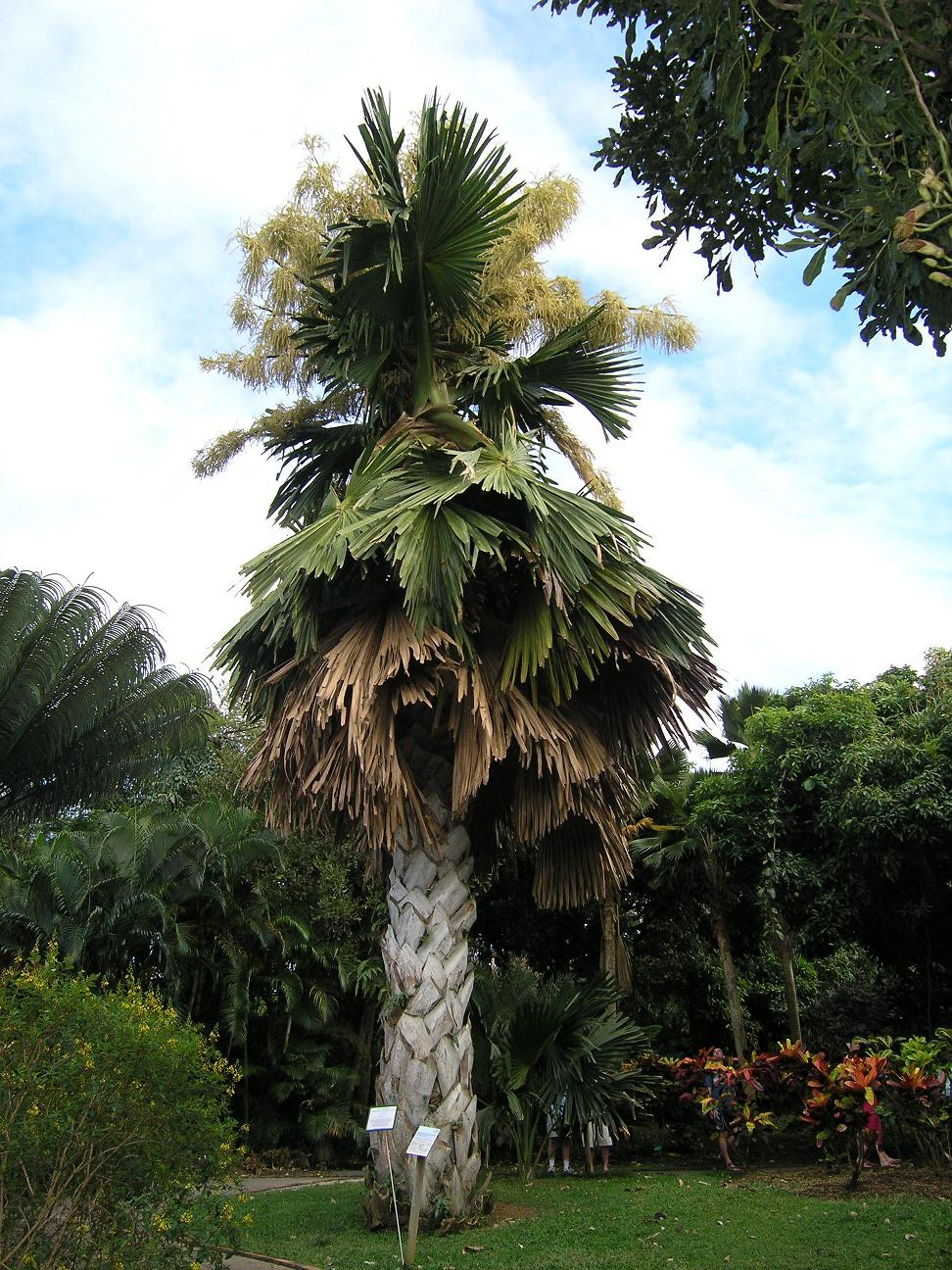
At Jardin Botanique de Deshaies, Guadeloupe

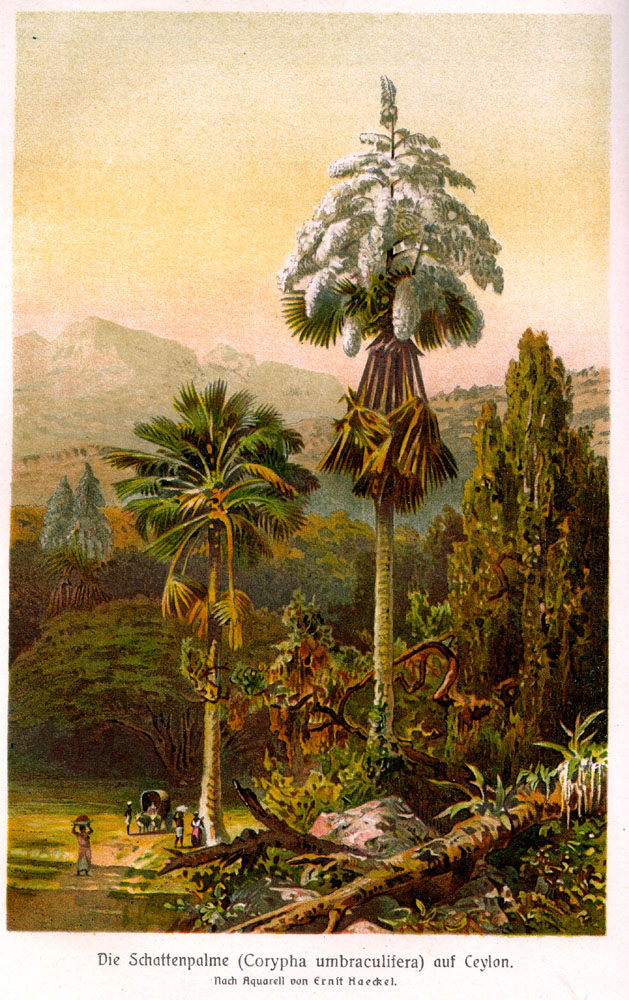
Corypha umbraculifera painting (1913)

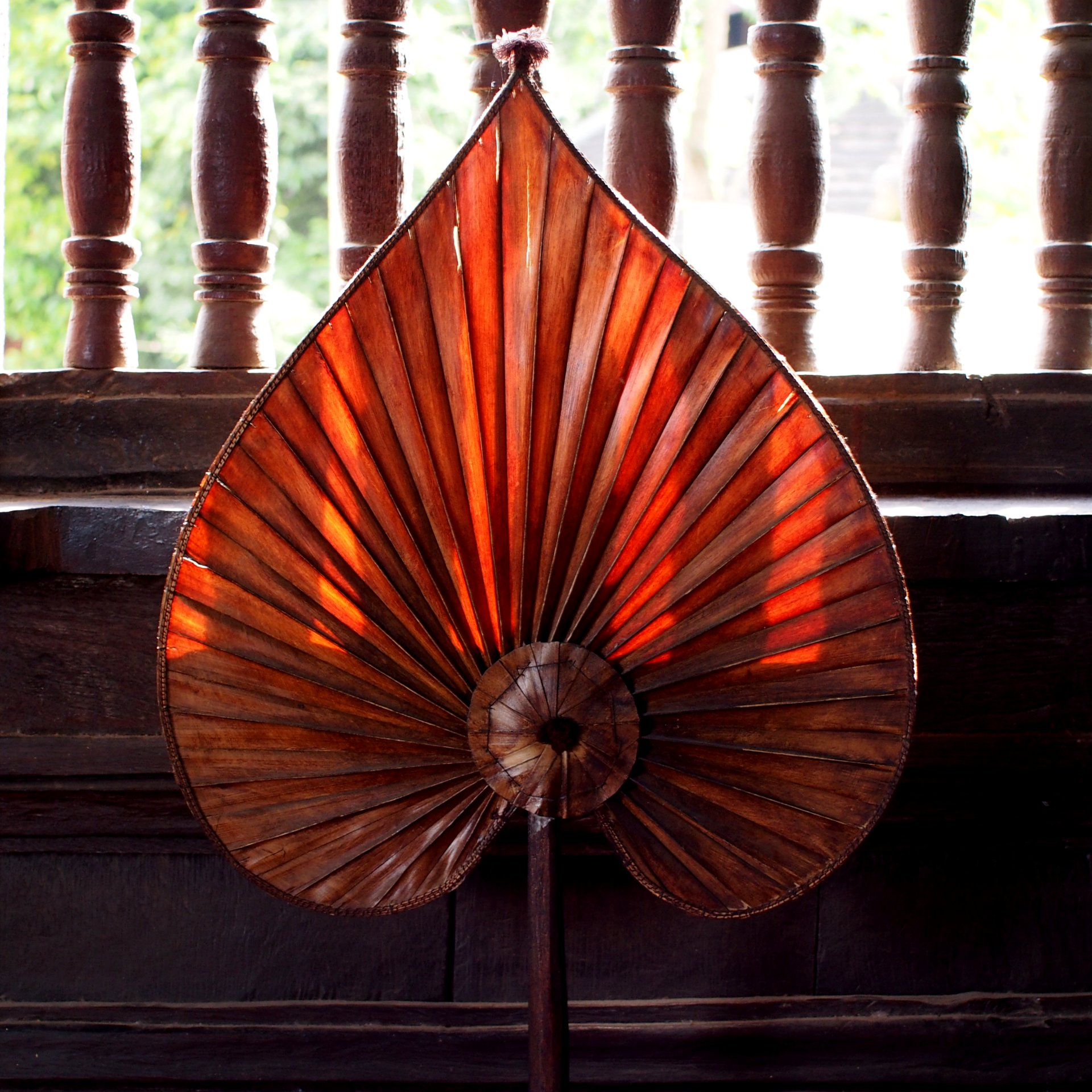
Talipot fan

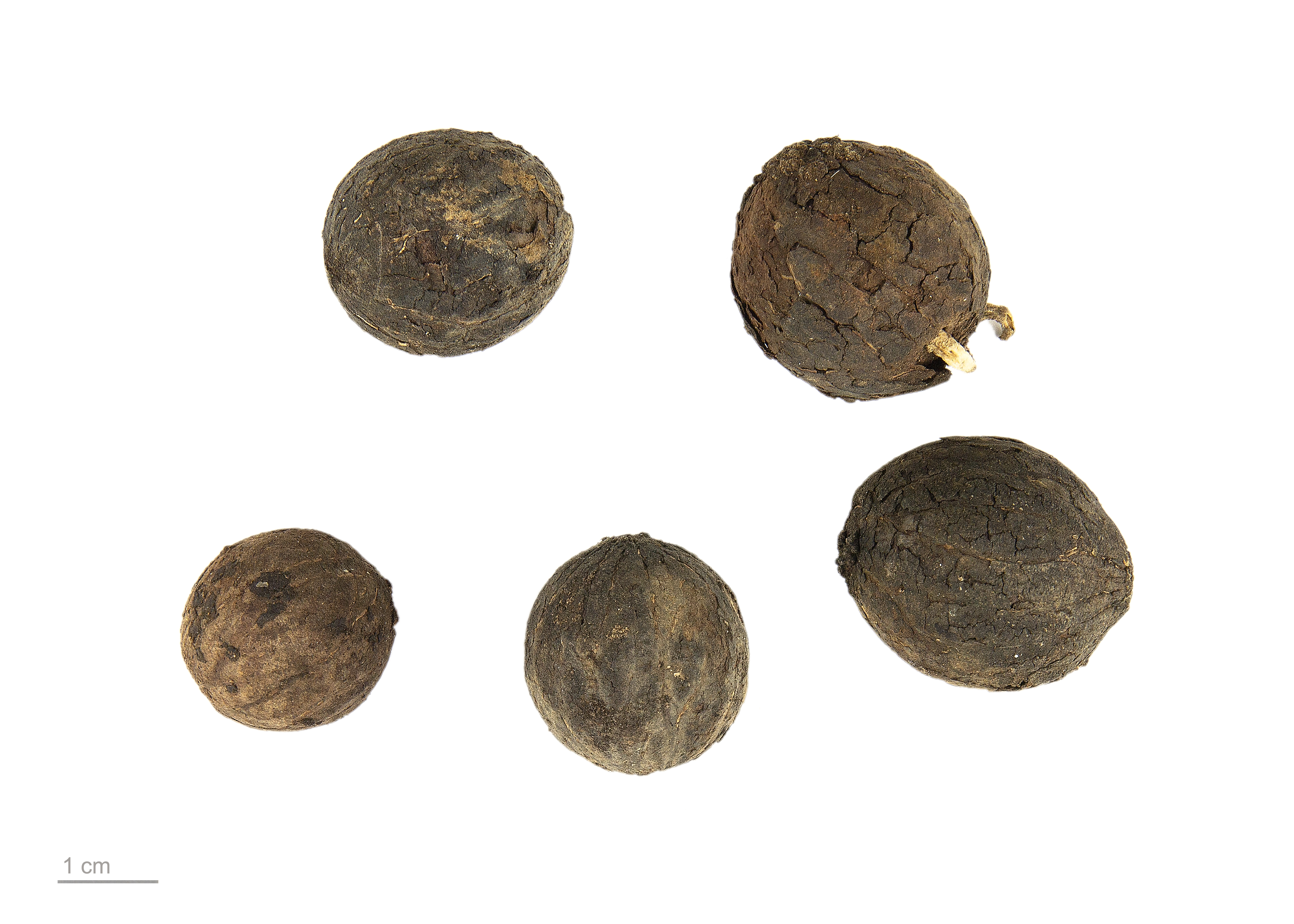
Corypha umbraculifera - MHNT

== See also ==
- Ola leaf
