= Jawi Peranakan =

Ethnic group of Malaysia and Singapore

Jawi Peranakan جاوي ڤرانقن
Regions with significant populations
- Malaysia and Singapore

Languages
- Malay, English

Religion
- Sunni Islam

Related ethnic groups
- Malaysian Indians · Indian Singaporeans · Malay

The Jawi Peranakan (Jawi: جاوي ڤرانقن) was an ethnic group found primarily within the Malaysian state of Penang and in Singapore, both regions were part of the historical Straits Settlements where their culture and history is centred around. The term "Jawi Peranakan" refers to locally born, Malay-speaking Muslims of mixed Tamil Indian Muslim and Malay ancestry (also known as Malay Peranakans). Over time, this has grown to include people with Arab ancestry as well. They were an elite group within the British Malayan community in mid-19th century Malaya. In addition to their substantial wealth and social standing, they are remembered for setting up the first Malay newspaper in Malaysia, Singapore, Indonesia and China, the Jawi Peranakan and their influences on Malay culture.

== History ==
Since Penang and Singapore's founding in 1786 and 1819, the number of South Asian immigrants to these colonies grew rapidly. Many were South Indian men. However, Jawi Peranakan ancestry does include a large number of other South Asians, from northern India and Pakistan. Women travelled to Singapore only from the 1860s, and even then in small numbers. This led to a shortage of South Asian brides, and so South Asian Muslim men often married Malay Muslim women. The descendants of these unions were called Jawi Peranakan.

"Jawi" is an Arabic word to denote Southeast Asia, while Peranakan is a Malay word meaning "born of" (it also refers to the elite, locally born Chinese). More broadly, South Asian Muslims without mixed parentage but born in the Straits Settlements were sometimes also called Jawi Peranakan, as were children from Arab-Malay marriages. Similar terms for mixed Malay-South Asian people were "Jawi Pekan" (mostly used in Penang). Jawi Peranakan families were found throughout Malaysia, especially Penang, and Singapore.

== Description ==
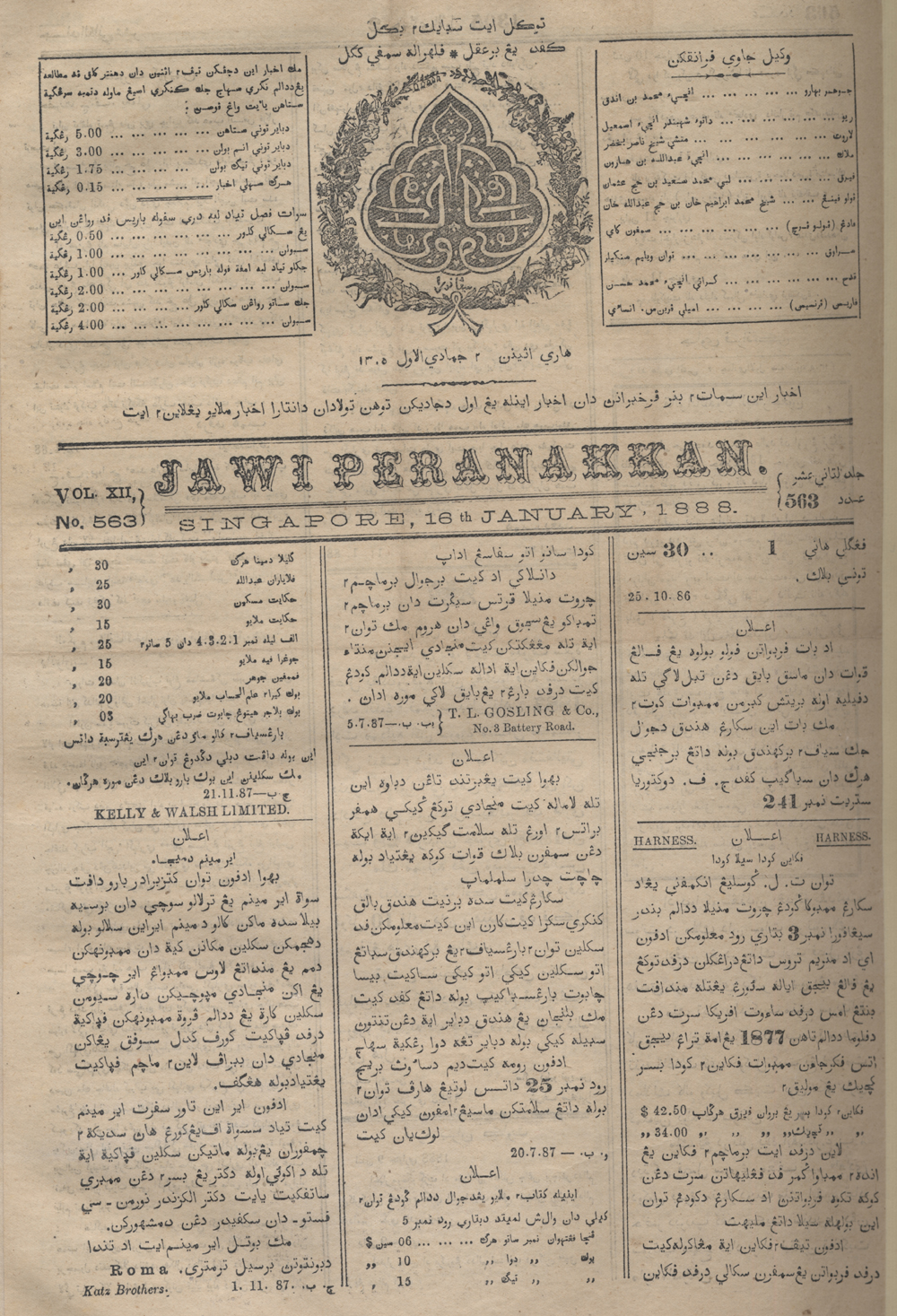
1888 newspaper

The Jawi Peranakan chose their spouses carefully, screening prospective matches for wealth and status, rather than racial origins. This enabled intermarriage between Jawi Peranakan and other prosperous local Muslim communities, like the Arabs, Indians and the Malay aristocrats. Despite assimilating into the Malay culture, the Jawi Peranakan maintained a distinct identity which was captured in their architecture, clothing, jewelry and cuisine. Also, the community placed a strong emphasis on getting an English education, especially since many Jawi Peranakans held Colonial Government jobs. Culturally, they contributed to the arts scene of the region, especially in music.

The Jawi Peranakan were enterprising and progressive and by the late 19th century, they had accumulated considerable wealth and status and contributed to the economy as merchants and landlords. They were also literate and English-educated, easily qualifying for government jobs. A group of Jawi Peranakan financed the first Malay language newspaper, the Jawi-Peranakan. Its first editor was Munsyi Mohamed Said Bin Dada Mohiddin, a South Indian Muslim who remained as editor for 12 years, from 1876 to 1888.

== Demise of the community ==
There are very few Jawi Peranakan families left in Singapore and Malaysia, especially Penang, which used to be their largest settlement. However, most today register as Malays. The loss of their identity is due to various causes. Economically, other competing mercantile groups were emerging. The Great Depression led many Jawi Peranakan business empires to bankruptcy and a severe fall in rent collected by landlords. Over time, the Jawi Peranakan grew increasingly dependent on government and clerical jobs.

By the turn of the 20th century, the political climate favoured the Malays. As the largest racial group and the indigenous people of Malaya, they were seen as the natural successors to the British with the waning of the British Empire. Projecting an identity that was distinctly apart from the Malays was therefore not expedient. Furthermore, the Jawi Peranakan tended to be reformist and they challenged the authority of Malay royalty in religious matters. Most were born and bred in the Straits Settlements, and had never been a subject of the Sultan. They therefore lacked this political and cultural quality which was seen to define a "true Malay".

== Descendants ==
In colonial Singapore and British Malaya, the Jawi Peranakan remain a community held in high regard by the local Malays primarily due to the educational achievements and the wealth inherited. Families such as the Angullias have left their mark on modern day Singapore with places like Angullia Park near Singapore's famous Orchard Road still bearing the name of the clan. Other families include the Mericans, Maricars or Maricans, originating from the Marakkars.

Due to intermarriage with other Muslim communities, many of their descendants inherited Arab (Syed, Sayyid) or to some extent Malay titles (Tengku, Wan, Megat). Many who are married to Malays have also dropped their surnames since most Malays practise a patronymic naming system. Today, most Jawi Peranakan descendants have assimilated into the broader Malay Muslim society.

== Notable individuals with Jawi Peranakan ancestry ==
=== Malaysia ===
- Abdullah bin Abdul Kadir: Author, translator and teacher
- Ayob Khan Mydin Pitchay: Former Deputy Inspector General of Police
- Mahathir Mohamad: Malaysia's fourth and seventh prime minister
- Marina Mahathir: Socio-political activist
- Mokhzani Mahathir: Businessman
- Mukhriz Mahathir: Former Menteri Besar of Kedah
- Nur Fathia: Malaysian actress
- Reezal Merican Naina Merican: Politician and former minister
- Shahrizat Abdul Jalil: Politician and former minister
- Vanida Imran: Malaysian actress

=== Singapore ===
- Halimah Yacob: Singapore's eighth president

== See also ==
- Peranakan
- Tamil Muslim
- Marakkars
