= Konda Karavas =

The Konda Karávas were a clan of Karáva nobles in medieval Sri Lanka. The term Konda in this context denoted a group of warriors and aristocrats, closely related to the Suriya clans — including Kurukulasuriya, Warnakulasuriya, Mihindukulasuriya, Bharathakulasuriya, Manukulasuriya, and Arasakulasuriya — as well as the Kón Karávas. The name is distinct from the modern Sinhala word konda (meaning hair), a usage that entered the language only after the 15th-century Kotte period, likely via Malay; prior to this the Sinhala language employed the terms kes, varalasa, dhammilla, and muhulasa to denote hair.

== Etymology and meaning ==
The word Konda (or Kondai) appears widely across South Indian epigraphy and royal nomenclature in contexts suggesting the meaning conqueror or one who has taken. The Chola king Parantaka I (r. 907–955 CE), after defeating the combined Sri Lankan and Pandyan armies and subsequently campaigning in Lanka, assumed the victory title Maduraiyum Eelamum Konda Parakesarivarman — meaning Parakesarivarman who conquered Madurai and Sri Lanka. The element Konda in this royal epithet therefore carried the sense of taker or conqueror. Similarly, Aditya I's victory over Kondai Mandalam (Tondaimandalam) shifted the balance of power between the Pallavas and the Cholas, contributing to the rise of the Chola empire. The Pallavas and Cholas were Kshatriya dynasties linked by intermarriage, and both claimed descent from the kings of the Mahabharata.

The name Konda was widely used in the Pandya kingdom. The Sri Lankan chronicle Mahavamsa records the names Punkonda, Khuddakancha Kunda, and Kanga Konda in connection with the 12th-century Pandyan invasion by a general of Parákramabáhu the Great (Mahavamsa 76.94, 76.140, 76.171 & 76.184). Two South Indian inscriptions by a Pandyan ruler named Kónerimel Kondán record that he had a camp at Gangakondapattana (Annual Report on South Indian Epigraphy, 1916, nos. 71–72). An inscription of the Sri Lankan king Sahasamalla likewise states that he spent two years in a place called Gangaikondapattana in India (Epigraphia Zeylanica II, 225).

The name Konda has also been preserved in Indian topography: Nagarjunakonda in Andhra Pradesh, an ancient Buddhist site of great archaeological significance, incorporates the element konda, which in the Kannada and Telugu languages denotes a hill.

== Konda Karávas in Sri Lanka ==
=== Family names and royal grants ===
The name Konda has survived in several Sri Lankan Karáva family names, including Vira Konda Árachchige, Vadana Konda Árachchige, and Vira Konda Patabendige. The Kurukula Charithaya (Part I, p. 235) reproduces a copper sannasa (royal grant) issued by King Vijayabahu — identified as Vijayabahu VI — to a Konda Perumal, at a time when the title Perumal denoted a prince. The same source lists the following Konda Kaurava family names: Konda Perumal Árachchigé (from Koggala) and Kuru Vira Kaundan, Periya Kondan, Sina Kondan, Sella Kondan, Vira Kondan, Kuru Vira Kondan, Kondagé, Vira Kondagé, Maha Kondagé, Punchi Kondagé, and Sella Kondagé from other parts of Sri Lanka.

=== Inscriptions and epigraphy ===
The Kudumirissa inscription of Sri Lanka refers to a clan known as the Kaundinya gothra. The Galgané copper sannasa describes Parákramabáhu sámi's ancestry as Sakala dig vijayavaliya ransa Konda Parákramabáhu piriven sámi. The prevalence of Konda in these records suggests a distinguished lineage of Kshatriya nobles connected to South Indian royal traditions.

=== Place names ===
Several Sri Lankan place names retain the Konda element. Ulakkonda is a village in Gangapalatha, Udunuvara; the nearby site of Muthukeliyáva, far removed from the pearl-producing coast, is said to evoke the pearl umbrellas (mutukuda) and other insignia associated with the Karávas. Maluvawatta lies to the east of Ulakkonda, where an ancient Bo tree stands with a tradition that it was planted by a Brahmin — suggesting that Ulakkonda may once have been a seat of Konda nobles (Sáhithya, Ministry of Culture, Sri Lanka, 1972, p. 72).

In 1761, two Kaurálas in a village named Kondagama in Tumpané signed a deed as witnesses (Gazetteer of the Central Province I, p. 468), further documenting the Konda–Karáva connection. An old Pattini Devale stands in the village of Kondadeniya, consistent with the Pattini cult's association with the Karávas brought back by King Gajabahu I following his South Indian campaign (Gazetteer II, p. 528).

The Rajavaliya records that a king named Edirimanasuriya ruled from a city called Mundakondapola (Rajavaliya, Suraweera edition, p. 234). Mundakondapola is situated approximately eight miles from Kurunegala on the Puttalam road, in the Hatara Korale — the old parana Kuru Rata (ancient Kuru Country) of the Karávas.

== South Indian connections ==
The prevalence of the name Konda across South India indicates that the Kondas constituted a significant group in mediaeval South Indian politics. Like other South Indian Kshatriya clans, the Kondas may have claimed ultimate descent from the Mahabharata Kauravas. The deeply interconnected nature of mediaeval Indian and Sri Lankan royal families is reflected in shared nomenclature: the name element Ganga appears in the Sri Lankan rulers Chodaganga and Gangavasa Kalyanavati, as well as in the place names Gangaikondapattana and the Ramnad district inscriptions noted above.

== Portuguese period ==
The Konda Karávas maintained their martial traditions into the era of Portuguese colonisation. The 16th-century Portuguese historian Diogo do Couto records that the chief arachchi of King Rajasinghe I was Paly Conde Arachchi, who commanded an army of 2,600 men in battle against the Portuguese (Couto, Decade X, Book vii, Chapter xiv).

A contemporary of the Konda king Edirimanasuriya of Mundakondapola was the Karáva King of Jaffna, Ethirimanasingham (fl. 1592–1615), a ruler of the Singhe Dynasty of Jaffna. The Karáva families of Tisseveerasinghe, Puvirajasinghe, Puvimanasinghe, and Philip trace their descent from this dynasty (The Singhe Dynasty of Jaffnapatam, Chevalier Dr St John Puvirajasinghe K.S.G., p. 19). The Karáva Patangatim Domingo Corea, also known as Edirimanasuriya, was appointed by King Dharmapala in the 16th century to rule the region of Mundakondapola, suggesting that the king of that name was a regional Karáva ruler — a Konda Karáva — possibly from the Kshatriya Keerawella family of the Hatara Korale.

An old Sinhala verse praises a king from Murakondaya who was deified as Irual Bandára and is described as being of the Suryawansa, the Kshatriya Solar dynasty (P. E. Pieris, Ceylon the Portuguese Era, Vol. I, p. 142).

== Legacy ==
The Konda Karávas appear to have formed part of the wider network of interrelated South Indian Kshatriya families that operated across the Chola, Pandya, and Pallava kingdoms and Sri Lanka during the medieval period. Over subsequent centuries, the Kondas as a distinct group were largely forgotten. Their memory survives only in a handful of place names and in the family names of the Karáva community.

== Bibliography ==
- Weerasuriya, A. S. F., Kurukula Charithaya, Part I. Kurukula Vendor, 1968.
- Geiger, Wilhelm (trans.), Mahavamsa. Pali Text Society, 1912.
- Epigraphia Zeylanica (EZ), Vol. II. Colombo Museum.
- Annual Report on South Indian Epigraphy. Calcutta, 1916, nos. 71–72.
- Sáhithya. Ministry of Culture, Sri Lanka, 1972.
- Lawrie, A. C., Gazetteer of the Central Province of Ceylon. 2 vols. Government Printer, Colombo, 1896–98.
- Suraweera, A. V. (ed.), Rajavaliya. Colombo, 1997.
- Pieris, P. E., Ceylon the Portuguese Era. 2 vols. Colombo, 1913.
- Puvirajasinghe, Chevalier Dr St John, The Singhe Dynasty of Jaffnapatam. Jaffna.
