= Ola leaf =

Traditional manuscript material

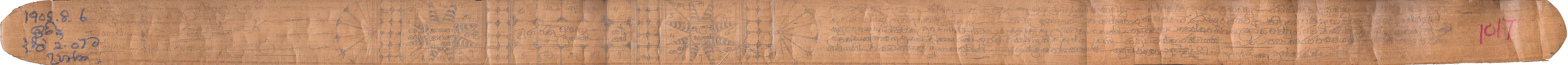
Horoscope written in Sinhala on an ola-leaf

Ola leaf is a palm leaf used for writing in traditional palm-leaf manuscripts and in fortune telling (horoscopes) in Southern India and Sri Lanka.

== The leaves ==
The leaves are from the talipot tree, a type of palm, and fortunes are written on them from ancient times and read by specialist fortune tellers. It is believed that three thousand years ago the seven rishis or, sages, wrote the fortunes of everyone who ever lived and will come, on the leaves. The National Library of Sri Lanka holds an ola-leaf manuscript collection.

== Composition ==
Sinhala letters are round-shaped and are written from left to right. They are the most circular-shaped script found in the Indic scripts. The evolution of the script to the present shapes may have taken place due to writing on ola leaves. The ground of a text more or less determines the way it is written down. Unlike chiseling on a rock for example, writing on palm leaves has to be more round-shaped to avoid the stylus ripping the palm leaf while writing on it. When drawing vertical or horizontal straight lines on Ola leaf, the leaves would have been ripped and this also may have influenced Sinhala script not to have a period or full stop. Instead a stylistic stop which was known as "Kundaliya" is used. Periods and commas were later introduced into Sinhala script after the introduction of paper due to the influence of Western languages.

The Mukkara Hatana, an ola-leaf manuscript now in the British Museum states that King Parakramabahu IV granted it to the Karavas ethnic group in Sri Lanka.

== Etymology ==
The word Ola derives from the Tamil word Ōlai, meaning palm leaf.

== See also ==
- Borassus
- Nadi astrology
