= Vaduge =

Family name

Badugé and Vadugé are two ancestral family names used to date by Karava families of Sri Lanka. It is derived from the Tamil Vatukar.

An 18th-century etching of the Vaduga King Kirti Sri Rajasinghe (1747-1781) of the Kshatriya Surya Vamsa with his courtiers paying obeisance to him. The objects carried in honour of the king are: Mutukuda (royal white umbrella), Álawattam (disks with sun emblems representing the king’s descent from the solar race), Wadanatalathu (ceremonial palm leaf shades), Válavíjani (yak tail whisks), Sak paliha (white conch shields) and ceremonial weapons. These royal symbols are used to date only by the Karavas at their family ceremonies and are also found on most old Karáva flags.

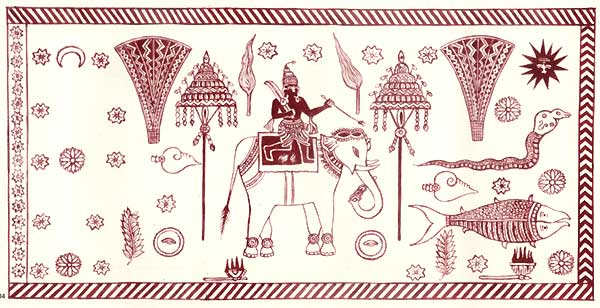
One of the many ancient Karava flags from Sri Lanka. Note the similarity of royal symbols with the etching above.
