= Timeline of the Kurukulam =

The following is a chronological overview of the history of the Karavas and Karaiyars caste of Sri Lanka and India. Both communities were historically also known as Kurukulam, meaning Kuru clan.

== Medieval period ==
- Under the reign of Virarajendra Chola (1063-1070 CE), the Chola rule ended through a rebellion led by Vijayabahu I, under the chief Kurukulatta Raiyan (King of Kurukulam), mentioned in an inscription in Thirumukkulam, Tamil Nadu.
- The Karaiyar captain Meekaman lead the Chola troops and defeated the Mukkuvar chief Vediarasan and Moor chief Meera. The Delft Island fort is thought as his fort and is thill this day locally known as Meekaman Kottai or "fort of Meekaman".
- The Mukkara Hatana, an old palm leaf manuscript from Sri Lanka, is an account of the defeat of the Mukkuvar by the Karaiyars in the Saka era 1159 and the taking of the fort of Puttalam after a three-month siege.

== Colonial period ==
- Under the leadership of Karaiyar chiefs Migapulle Arachchi and Varunakulattan, aligned with the Thanjavur Nayak, fought with the Jaffna king Cankili II against the Portuguese in the conquest of the Jaffna kingdom.
- The Prince of Uva, Kuruvita Rala, who was a Karava revolted with his troops against the Portuguese and also raided the Kingdom of Kandy, driving the king Senarat out of his capital.
- Weerahannadige Patabendi Francisco Fernando alias Puran Appu, a Catholic Karava led a revolt against the colonial British in 1848.

== Independent period ==
- The British establishment of Burma as a separate unit from its Indian empire in the 1930s, harmed the flourishing trade that was accomplished by the Karaiyars. The Karaiyars traditionally traded and shipped pearls, chanks, rice and other goods to India, Myanmar and Indonesia which was heavily restricted and controlled under the British government.
- Karavas formed the elites under colonial era. Several Karavas, such as James Peiris, fought for the Sri Lankan independence movement
- The Janatha Vimukthi Peramuna, was founded by Rohana Wijeweera. Wijeweera and many other Karavas, formed the leadership of this organization.
- The Liberation Tigers of Tamil Eelam, was founded by Velupillai Prabhakaran. Prabhakaran and many other Karaiyars, formed the leadership of this organization.
- Chief Karava families such as the de Mels, the Peiris and the Soysas were heavily involved in estate-owning sector, mainly in coconut and rubber. Entrepreneuring Karavas controlled important commercial groups such as Mackwoods Ltd, Brown's Group Ltd, Richard Pieris Ltd and J. L. M. Fernando's group.
