= Chulia =

Chulia could refer to:

- Chulia Street, George Town, in Penang, Malaysia
- Middle name of Salvador Chuliá Hernández (1944–2025)
