= Kokila Sandeśa =

The Kokila Sandeśa (Sanskrit: कोकिलसन्देश) or "The Message of The Koel" is a Sanskrit love poem written by Uddanda Śāstrī in the 15th century AD. A short lyric poem of 162 verses, it describes how a nameless hero, abducted from his wife's side by mysterious women, sends a message to her via a koel. The poem belongs to the sandeśa kāvya, (‘messenger poem’) genre and is modelled upon the Meghadūtaof Kālidāsa. It is one of the most famous of the many sandeśa kāvya poems from Kerala.

== The Poet ==
Uddaṇḍa Śāstrī was a 15th-century Tamil from a village whose learning and scholarship is so great that even the parrots are reciting the Vedas as the koil flies past. He made his way west, seeking patronage, and eventually ended up in Kerala where he is said to have married a lady from Chendamangalam (which leads some to assume the poem's heroine, of the Marakkara household in Chendamangalam, is in fact his wife).

The poet is supposed to have acquired the title Uddaṇḍa, which means 'pre-eminent' (literally 'one who has a stick upraised'), from the Zamorin court of Calicut where he found patronage; his original name was Irugupanātha. It was this verse, the very first words the poet spoke to the Zamorin, which is said to have earned him his name:

उद्दण्डः परदण्डभैरव भवद्यात्रासु जैत्रश्रियो
हेतुः केतुरतीत्य सूर्यसरणिं गच्छन् निवार्यस्त्वया।
नो चेत् तत्पटसम्पुटोदरलसच्छार्दूलमुद्राद्रवत्
सारङ्गं शाशिबिम्बमेष्यति तुलां त्वत्प्रेयसीनां मुखैः॥

== Genre ==
The sandeśa kāvya ('messenger poem') genre is one of the best defined in Indian literature. There are about over 30 messenger poems in Sanskrit from Kerala alone plus many other Sanskrit and regional-language ones from other parts of the country. Each follows Kālidāsa's Megha Dūta to a greater or lesser extent. Most involve two separated lovers, one of whom sends the other a message, and thus are designed to evoke the śṛṅgāra rasa ('feeling of love'). They tend to adhere to a bipartite structure in which the first half charts the journey the messenger is to follow, while the second describes the messenger's destination, the recipient and the message itself.

== Editions of the Kokila Sandeśa ==
Editions include:

1. Anantanarayana Sastri, PS. 1939. Kokilasandeśa of Uddaṇḍa Śāstrī. Second edition. The Mangalodayam Press, Trichur. This includes notes in Sanskrit and is based on a single manuscript. Out of print.
2. Unni, NP. 1972. Kokilasandeśa of Uddaṇḍa. College Book House, Trivandrum. AND Unni, NP. 1997. Kokilasandeśa of Uddaṇḍa. Second edition. Keralasamskṛtam Publications, Trivandrum. This includes an extensive introduction, a resume in English and notes on the poem. Unni's edition is a critical edition based on four manuscripts and two printed editions, including Sastri's.
3. Muraleemadhavan, PC. 1999. Kokilasandeśa of Uddaṇḍa Śāstrī. Printed in Malayalam script with a word-for-word Malayalam translation, introduction and notes. This edition is based on over ten manuscripts.
4. Rajaraman, S and Kotamraju, V. 2012. The Message of the Koel: Uddaṇḍa Śāstri’s Kokila Sandeśa. Rasala, Bangalore. A bilingual edition of the poem with a contemporary English translation.

== Bibliography ==
- Anantanarayana Sastri, PS. 1939. Kokilasandeśa of Uddaṇḍa Śāstrī. Second edition. The Mangalodayam Press, Trichur.
- Unni, NP. 1972. Kokilasandeśa of Uddaṇḍa. College Book House, Trivandrum.
- Unni, NP. 1997. Kokilasandeśa of Uddaṇḍa. Second edition. Keralasamskṛtam Publications, Trivandrum.
- Muraleemadhavan, PC. 1999. Kokilasandeśa of Uddaṇḍa Śāstrī.
- Rajaraman, S and Kotamraju, V. 2012. The Message of the Koel: Uddaṇḍa Śāstri's Kokila Sandeśa. Rasala, Bangalore.
- Monier-Williams, Monier (1899). A Sanskrit-English Dictionary. Oxford: The Clarendon press.
- Vidyasagara, J. Mallikāmāruta of Uddaṇḍa Śāstrī. 1878. Calcutta
