= Marakkar =

Indian Muslim community

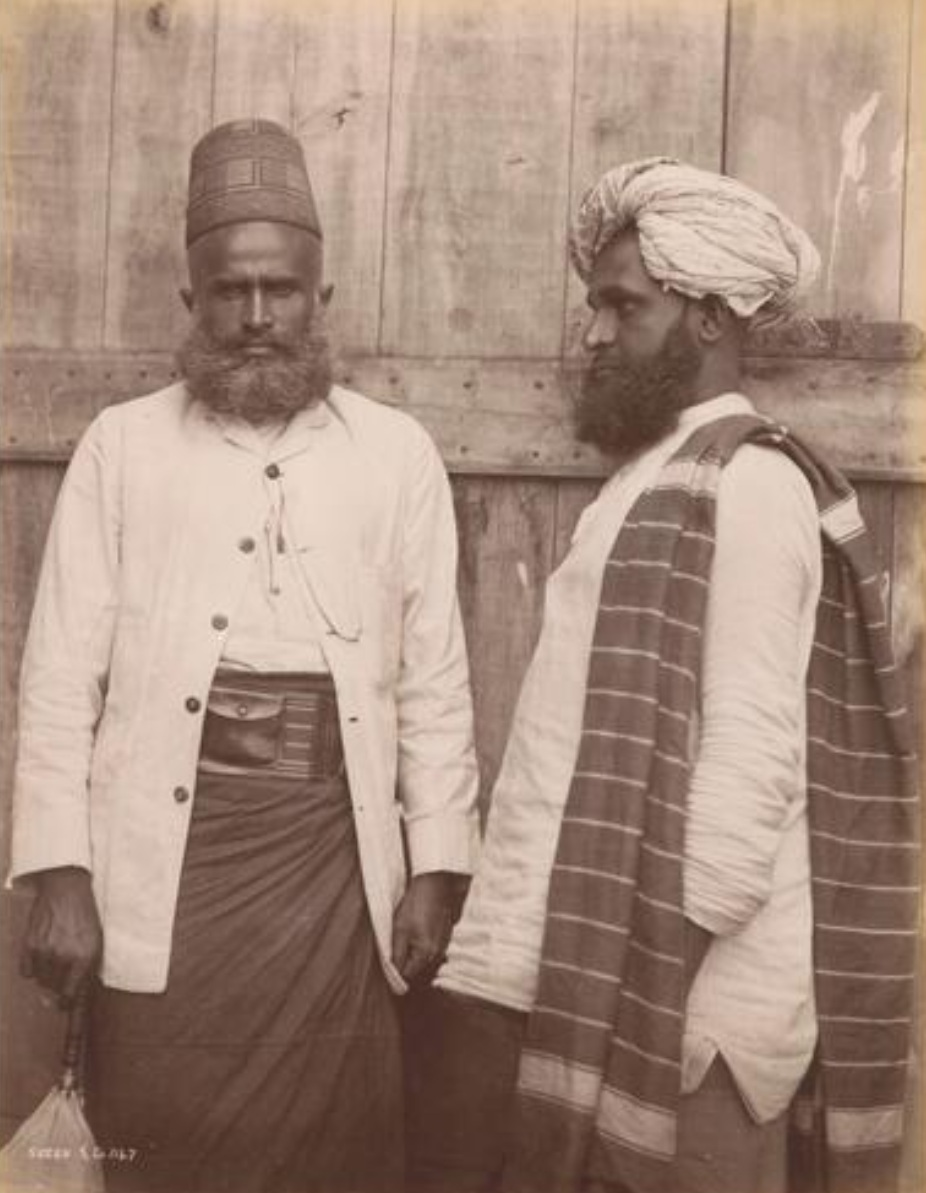
- Sri Lankan Marakkars in the business district of Colombo (Pettah), 1891

Total population
- ~3 million

Religions
- Islam

Scriptures
- Quran & Hadith

Languages
- Malayalam • Tamil • Sinhala • Malay • Arwi

The Marakkars or Sonaka Mappila or Sonakar (Note: Marakkar is the Malayalam spelling. Other spellings include Maricar, Marecar, Marikkar, Markiyar, Marican, Marecan, Tamil Marrakayar and Sinhalese Marakkala.) (Tamil: சோனகர், romanized: Cōṉakar; Arwi: چٗونَكَرْ) are a panethnic Muslim mercantile community native to the Coromandel and Malabar coasts of southern India and to Sri Lanka, with historic diaspora communities in Malaysia, Singapore, Indonesia, Myanmar, Vietnam and Laos, many of them more than two centuries old.

Historically, Tamil-speaking Shafi'i Muslims were known as Sonaka Mappila, or Sonahar. The name is a Tamilized form of Jonaka Mappila, the older name for the Muslims of Kerala, who lived on the western side of historical Tamilakam. The "Sonaka" element preserves the label once used for the Muslim members of the Anjuvannam, a medieval maritime merchant guild originally based in the densely populated ports of Malaimandalam.

According to Raja Mohammed and W. Francis, by the 17th century the Sonahar of what is now Tamil Nadu had begun to divide along occupational lines. The Marakkayars, or Marakkars, consolidated around shipowning and the carrying trade, while the Lebbais were associated with import-export commerce, a category fluid enough to absorb mariners as well. The term Sonahar is still used, but in Tamil Nadu it now refers specifically to the Marakkars. No such division emerged across the Palk Strait in Sri Lanka, where the Moor community is believed to have formed before the split; there, all native Muslims are still known simply as Ilankai Sonahar.

Along with their closely allied Hindu co-ethnics, the Nattukottai Chettiar, the Marakkars are best known for their predominant role in the southeast asian Spice Trade, in which they were a leading force for some four centuries, from the 15th century into the early 19th. Known in the Malay world as Chulias, they rose to high office in Malay courts such as those of Kedah, Perak and Aceh, often serving as saudagar raja (royal merchant). Their reach led one rival English trader to describe them as "a people that range into all the kingdoms and countries of Asia." Some historians also credit them with a significant role in the spread of Islam across the Indonesian Archipelago.

The Portuguese arrived in the early 16th century intent on controlling the spice trade, which brought them into direct conflict with the Marakkars, among its leading carriers. This conflict first materialized in the Malabar Coast, the heart of the pepper trade, the Kunjali Marakkars fought the Portuguese armadas for roughly a century, in what is often described as the first sustained Indian resistance to European colonialism. In Southeast Asia, where the Portuguese seized the spice port of Melaka in 1511, Marakkar merchants instead rerouted their trade to ports beyond Portuguese reach. The communities they settled along the way later became part of the Jawi Peranakan of British Malaya.

== Early History ==
=== Indian Ocean Commerce ===
Indian Ocean trade networks already stretched from Canton in China to the Mediterranean. Until 900 CE, single ships often sailed the entire Gulf-to-China route, dominated by Persian and later Arab Muslim merchants serving the Abbasid and Tang empires. Due to decline of the Abbasids and Tangs and due to efficiency considerations arising from monsoon wait-times, Gulf-to-Canton route segmented into three distinct routes serviced by distinct mercantile communities: Arabian Sea, Bay of Bengal, and South China Sea.

This segmentation turned once-transient West Asian traffic, which had paused only briefly in India en route to China, into permanent settlement at ports such as Cambay, Calicut, and those of Sri Lanka, seeding the Indo-Muslim communities that would come to line the coast.

=== Anjuvannam ===
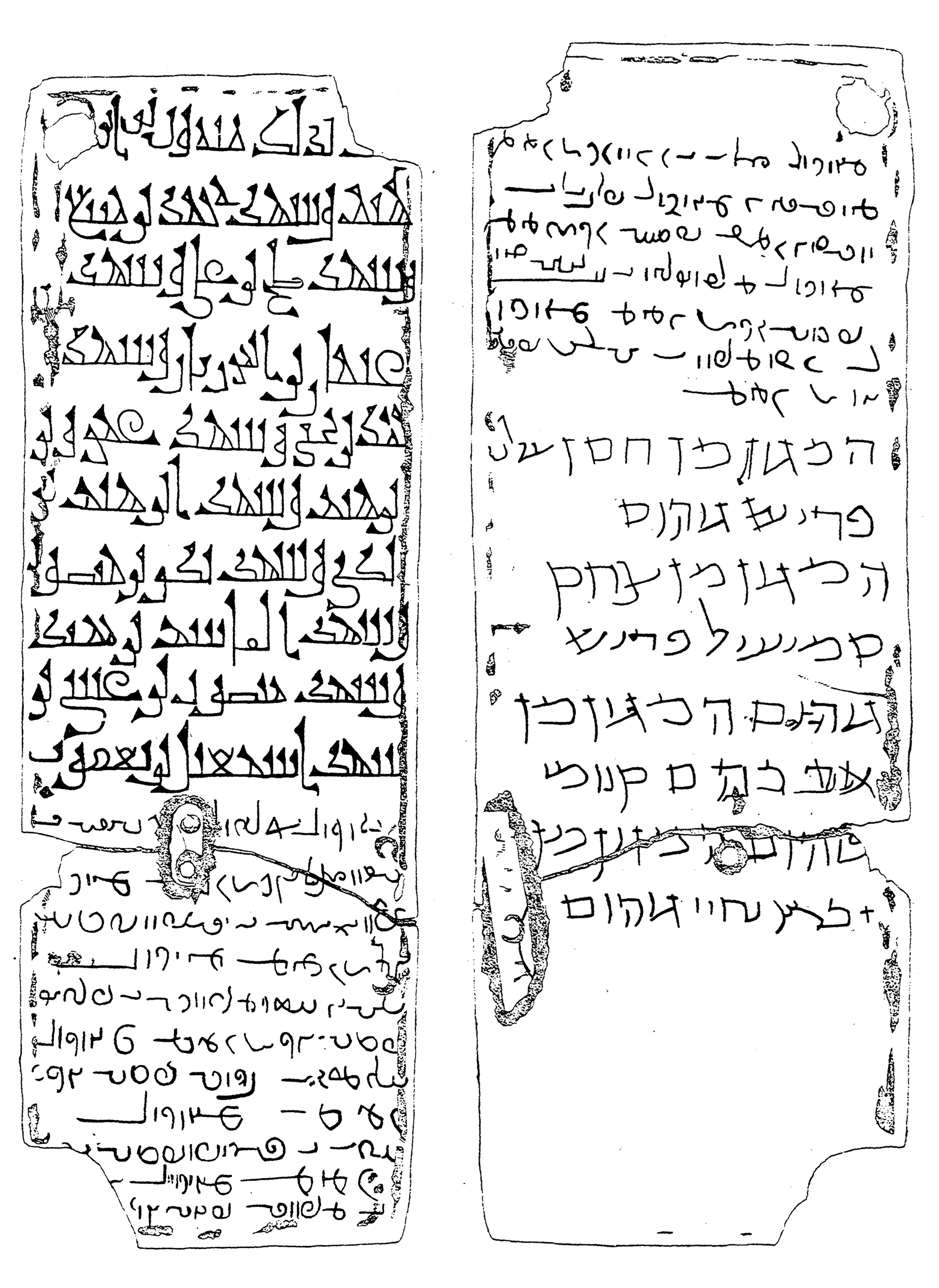
Quilon Copper Plates (Anjuvannam)

The Anjuvannam is the epigraphic fingerprint of that settling-in. A maritime merchant corporation of West Asian seafarers, its name drawn from the Persian anjuman (Avestan hanjamana, "assembly"), it is documented from the mid-ninth century onward, confined to port towns in coastal India. Its early membership was mixed, spanning Arabs, Jews, Persians, and Christians, but from the eleventh century it tilted decisively Muslim. The settlements are recorded in the Quilon Syrian copper plates which was given to Syrian Christian Merchant Maruwan Sapir Iso and both Anjuvannam and Manigramam, guilds were made witnesses to the event.

The southern division of this organization is plausibly the progenitor of the Sonahar, or Marakkars, and the nominal link is nearly explicit in the record. The earliest figure is Asavu, a merchant of the anjuvannam of present-day Mantai on Sri Lanka's northwest coast, recorded in an inscription of 1090; his title carries the epithet vidyadhara, associated specifically with a Sonaka official, while another of his titles already registers his links to the Kerala coast. The literary Palchandamalai likewise identifies the anjuvannam settled at Nagapattinam as "Sonaka" and worshippers of Allah.

By the twelfth century they appear in substantially the form we know today: coastal Muslim maritime traders who, among their commercial rights, held a royal charter over the pearl fisheries and the authority to tax-farm the littoral. Their network ran the length of the coast and fed directly into the older, denser Muslim trading world of the Kerala ports, the very connection Asavu's own title already registers.

== Branches ==
There are at least four known branches of Marakkars: Pandyamandala Marakkars of coastal Tamil Nadu, Eezhamandala Marakkars of Sri Lanka, Cholamandala Marakkars of Coromandel and Southeast Asia, and Malabar Marakkars of Kerala.

=== Marakkars of Sri Lanka ===
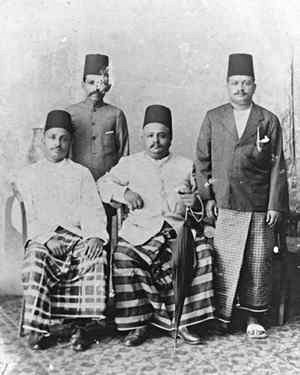
Sri Lankan Marakkars (Sapphire Merchants)

In present day, the Marakkars of Sri Lanka are called Sri Lankan Moors, compromising 10.5% of the Sri Lankan population with an aggregate population of 2,283,246. They were historically called Chonakar or Eezhamandala Marakkar. They have over a thousand-year history in the western coast of Sri Lanka, tracing their origin to the Sabaen and Dilmun traders pre-dating Islam. They are disproportionately urban, constituting 42.9% of the capital city of Colombo, and are known on the island for being a "market-dominant minority" inhabiting urban centers. They are native Tamil speakers with high degrees of Sinhalese bilingualism.

Today, Chonaka Moors remain politically and economically influential on the island. Politically, they are represented in every national party and have held all major ministerial portfolios, including finance, justice, education, and trade. They have also produced five Supreme Court Justices since independence.

Economically, though their sectoral monopolies diminished following Sirimavo Bandaranaike's nationalization policies and socialist reforms, they remain influential in textiles, precious metals, pharmaceuticals, commercial real estate, import-export trade, and retail. Eastern Moor landlords, or Sonaha Poddiyar, also hold substantial tracts of the most arable paddy land in the eastern provinces.

=== Marakkars of Southeast Asia (Chulias) ===
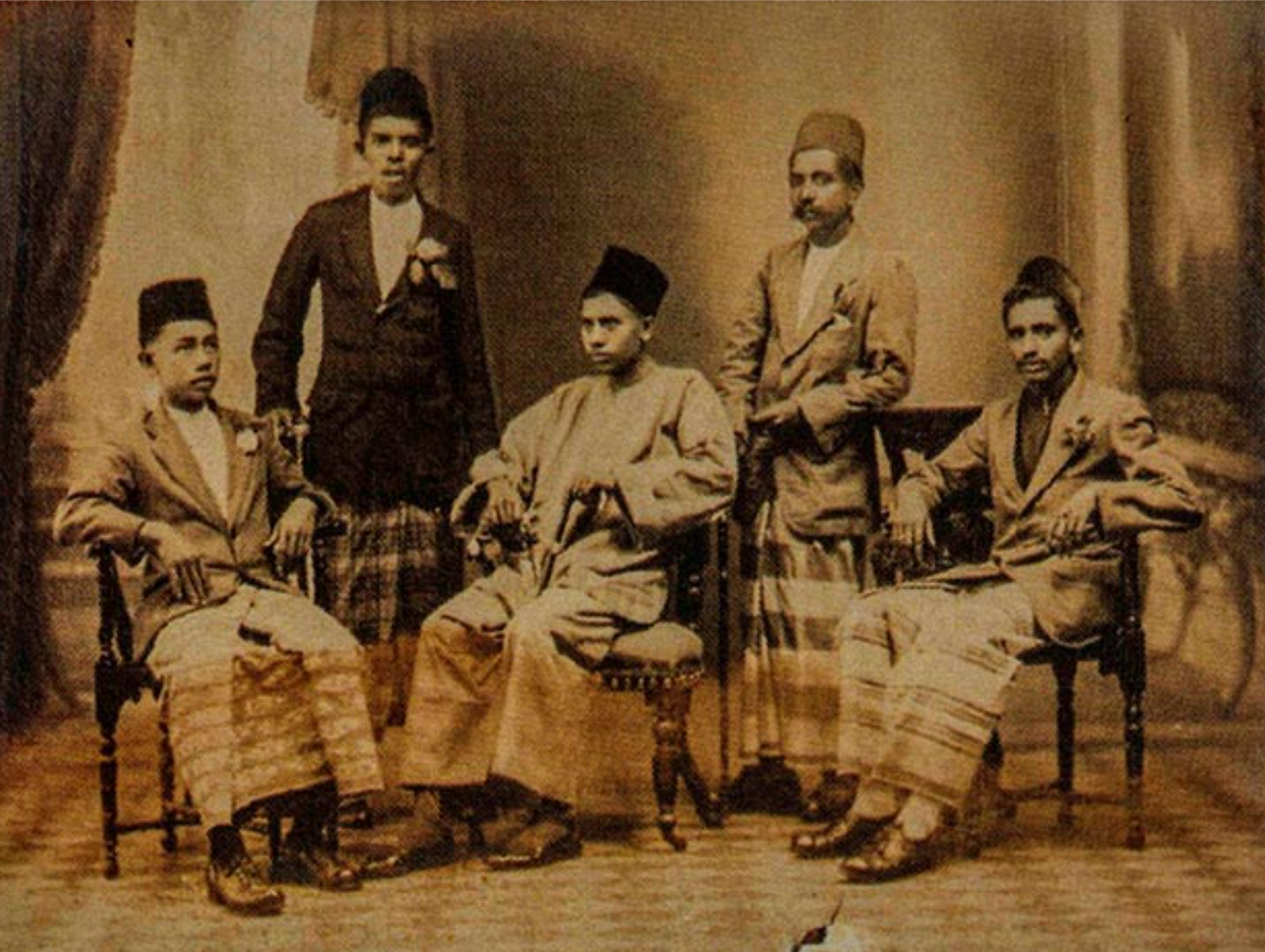
Chulia Marakkars of Penang (Early 20th Century)

The Chulia Marakkars of Southeast Asia, known historically as Chulias or Klings, are Tamil-speaking Muslim Marakkar merchants from the Tamil Nadu, Sri Lanka, and Kerala, who established permanent communities across the Malay Peninsula, Singapore, and the Indonesian archipelago.

==== Before 1786 ====
Chulia Marakkars were present in Southeast Asian ports from at least the 14th century, forming one of the principal trading communities at Malacca by the time of Portuguese conquest in 1511. They maintained their own settlement called Kampong Palli and were noted by Italian traveller Nicolas Conti as being "very rich, so much so that some will carry on their business in forty of their own ships."

In the Malacca Sultanate, Tamil Muslims attained the highest offices of state. Bendahara Tun Ali served as the fourth prime minister, while his son Tun Mutahir became the seventh Bendahara, whose efficient administration attracted foreign traders and brought Malacca to its commercial zenith around 1500. Sultan Muhammad Syah married Tun Ali's sister, Tun Wati, producing the future Sultan Muzaffar Syah.

Following Malacca's fall, Chulia merchants dispersed to friendlier ports in Aceh, Kedah, Perak, and the Tenasserim coast. By the 17th century, they dominated trade between India and the Malay Peninsula, with Malay rulers of Kedah, Perak, Terengganu, and Johor appointing them as saudagar raja (king's merchants) to manage royal trading activities. Prominent saudagar raja included Sidi Lebbe and Tambi Kecil (titled Raja Mutabar Khan) in Perak, and Syed Nina, Piro Mohamed, and Raja Jamal in Kedah. Their appointment reflected Chulia strengths: connection to complex commercial networks, negotiating competence, accounting skills, shared Islamic faith with Malay rulers, and multilingual fluency.

==== After 1786 ====
The British establishment of Penang (1786) and Singapore (1819) drew large-scale Chulia migration from the Coromandel Coast. Captain Francis Light estimated 1,000 Chulias in early Penang, with annual arrivals of 1,500–2,000 more. By the 1833 census, there were 7,886 Chulias in Penang and 510 in Province Wellesley. Cauder Mohideen Merican was appointed the first Kapitan Kling in 1801 and founded the Kapitan Keling Mosque, which holds one of Malaysia's largest waqf endowments.

Economically, Chulia Marakkars virtually monopolised Penang's shipping and stewarding industry, providing lighters (tongkangs) for loading and unloading cargo, earning them the nickname "Mamak Tongkang." They dominated the textile trade with Southeast Asia, exporting blue cloths, chintz, ginghams, and long cloths from Coromandel ports. When British cotton manufactures began competing from the 1820s, Chulia merchants adapted by diversifying into provision stores, jewellery, money-changing, and publishing.

Today, Chulia Marakkars remain influential in the restaurant trade (approximately 12,000 mamak establishments nationwide), jewellery, textiles, pharmaceuticals, and retail. The nasi kandar trade, originating with Chulia rice sellers in colonial Penang, has evolved into a multi-million ringgit franchise industry. Replicas of the Nagore Dargah in Penang and Singapore commemorate the community's enduring transoceanic Sufi networks.

=== Jawi Peranakan ===
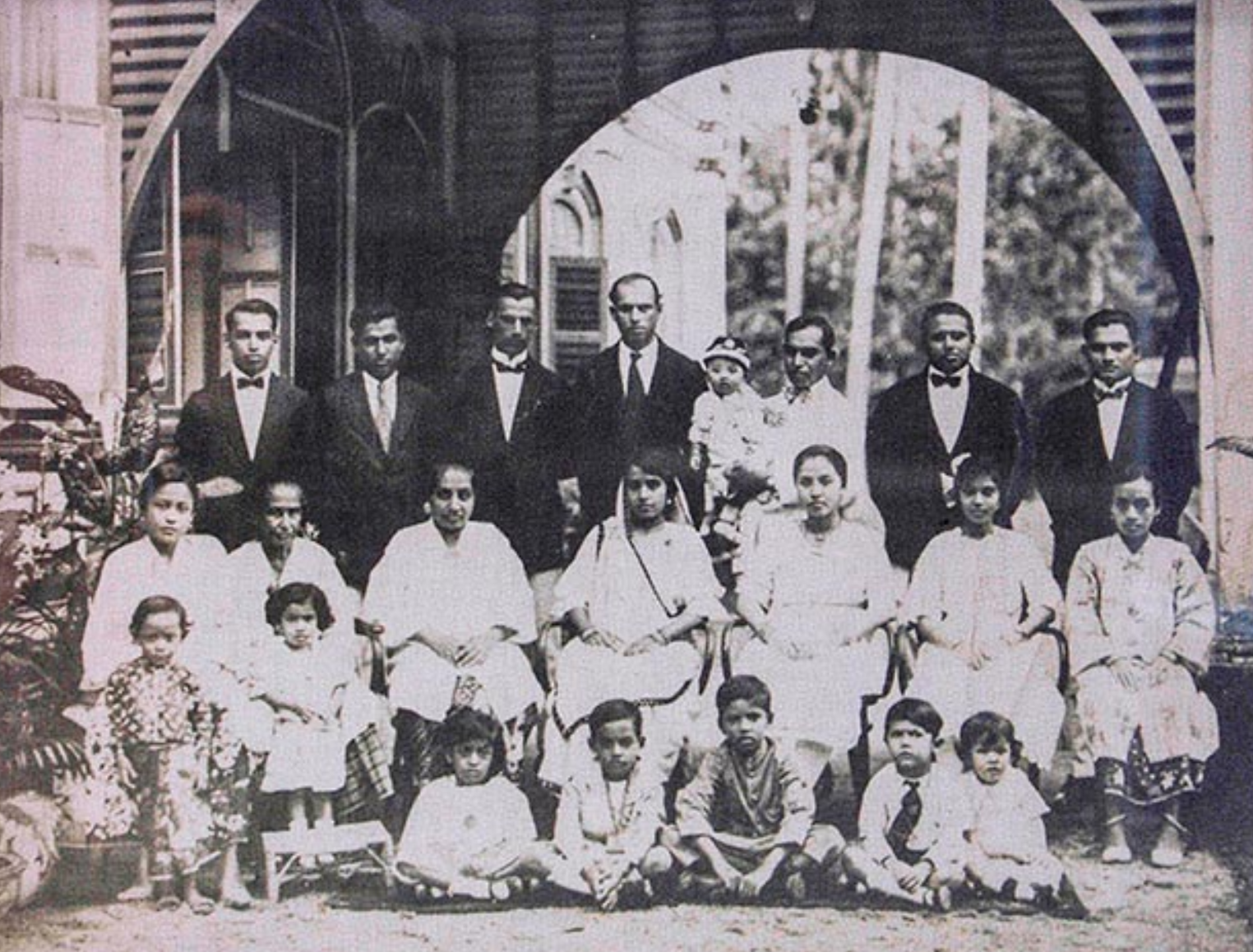
Merican Clan of the Jawi Peranakan

The Jawi Peranakan (also called Jawi Pekan, meaning "town Muslim") emerged from intermarriage between Chulia merchants and local Malay women, forming a distinct Indo-Malay community concentrated in Penang and Singapore. By the late 19th century, they had accumulated considerable wealth and status, ranking "next to the Arabs in leadership and authority within the Malay-Muslim community." Their English education facilitated employment in the colonial government as clerks, translators, and teachers.

The Jawi Peranakan population in Penang grew from 3,491 in 1871 to 5,462 in 1881. Prominent families such as Maricans left lasting marks on the urban landscape. Through intermarriage with Malay and Arab families, many descendants inherited titles such as Syed, Tengku, or Wan, while others adopted Malay patronymic naming conventions.

The Jawi Peranakan pioneered Malay-language journalism and publishing. According to historian William Roff, "Malay journalism, like book publication in Malay, owes its origins very largely" to this community. The Jawi Peranakkan ("The Local Born Muslim"), launched in Singapore in 1876, was the first Malay newspaper in the region and the longest-running before World War I. Its founding editor, Munsyi Mohd Said Dada Mohiddin, a Penang-born Tamil Muslim, served for twelve years until his death in 1888. The newspaper identified entirely with Malay interests, speaking always of "we Malays" and reporting Malay affairs.

Over the following three decades, Jawi Peranakan established at least twelve Malay-language newspapers: five in Singapore (Jawi Peranakkan, Sekola Melayu, Nujumul-Fajar, Shamsul-Kamar, Taman Pengetahuan), five in Penang (Tanjung Penegeri, Pemimpin Warta, Lengkongan Bulan, Bintang Timor, Chahaya Pulau Pinang), and two in Perak (Sri Perak, Jajahan Melayu).

Munshi Abdullah (1796–1854), of Tamil and Yemeni descent, is widely regarded as the "father of modern Malay literature." Born in Malacca and fluent in Arabic, Tamil, Hindi, and Malay, he served as scribe to Sir Stamford Raffles and translator for the London Missionary Society. His autobiography Hikayat Abdullah (1849) marked a radical departure from court literature, offering vivid, colloquial descriptions of everyday life. He is also considered the first Malayan journalist, taking Malay literature beyond folk-stories into historical description.

By the early 20th century, as Malay nationalism emerged, the Jawi Peranakan increasingly identified as Malays. They established the Penang Malay Association (1927) to promote Malay interests vis-à-vis the British government. In 1946, they played a major role in founding UMNO's Penang branch, with S.M. Aidid as founder president. Second and third generation Jawi Peranakan received scholarships as Malays, entered the civil service, and served with distinction. Today, most register simply as Malays, their distinct identity having merged into the broader Malay community through social amalgamation and shared Islamic practice.

=== Marakkars of Kerala ===
In Kerala, Marakkar, known as Marikkars, are primarily concentrated in and around Malabar.

According to tradition, Marakkars were originally marine merchants of Kochi who left for Ponnani in the Samoothiri Raja's dominion when the Portuguese came to Kochi. They offered their men, ships and wealth in defence of their motherland to the Samoothiri of Kozhikode.The Raja, who took them into his service and eventually became the Admirals of his fleet. They served as the naval chiefs in the Zamorin's army. Kunjali Marakkar, one of the first Keralites to rebel against the Portuguese, hailed from the Marikkar community.

== Religion ==
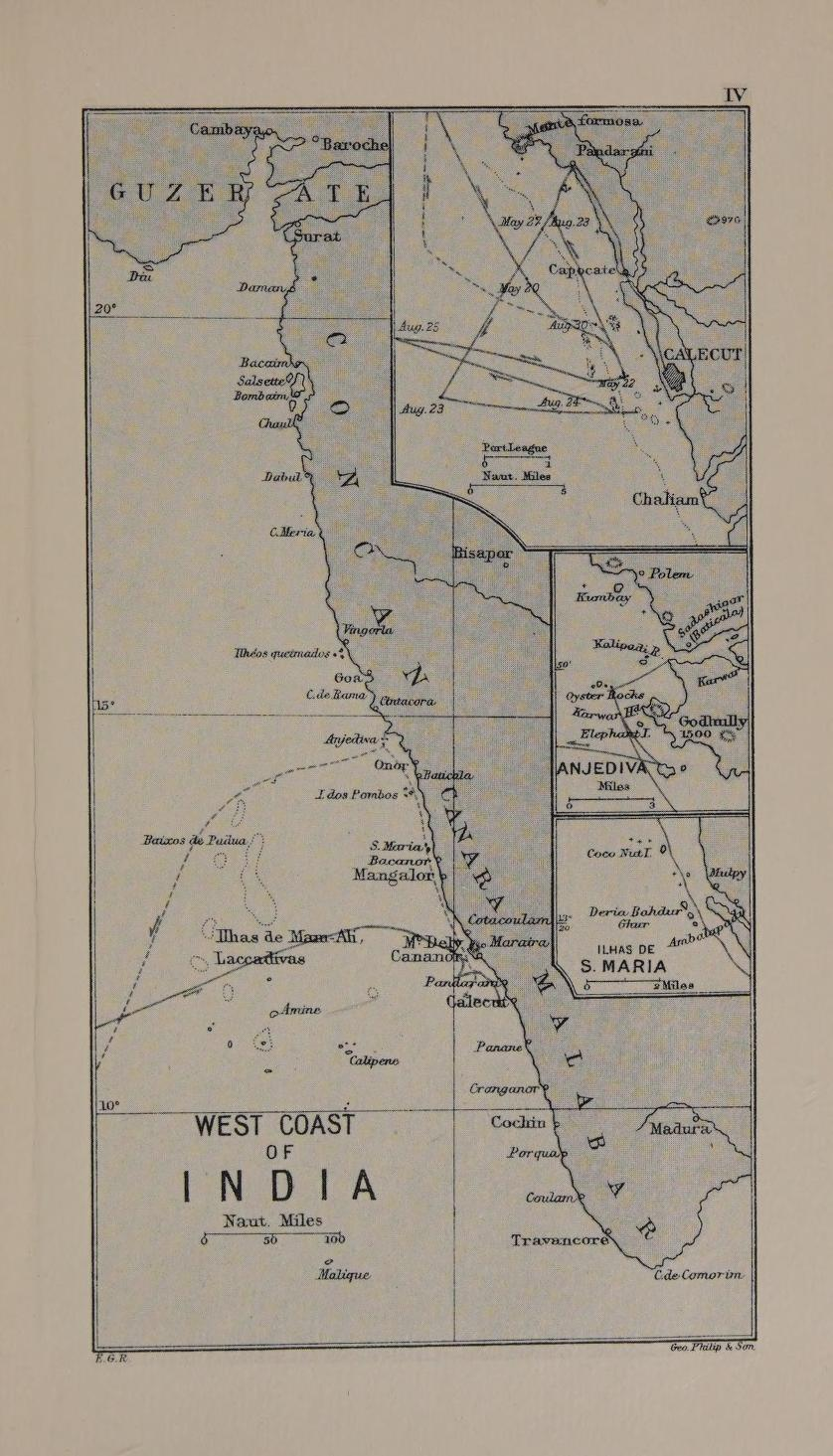
West Coast of India

In contrast to the Hanafis of Northern India, Bangladesh, and Pakistan, the Marakkars are part of a distinct South Indian Muslim community that follows the Shafi'i school of Islamic jurisprudence. They are one of several interconnected cultural groups along India's southwestern coast, including the Nawayaths of Konkan, Kodava Maaple of Coorg, Bearys of Tulu Nadu, and the Mappillas of Malabar. These communities share common religious practices and cultural traditions shaped by their coastal heritage and historical trade connections.

== Role in regional history ==
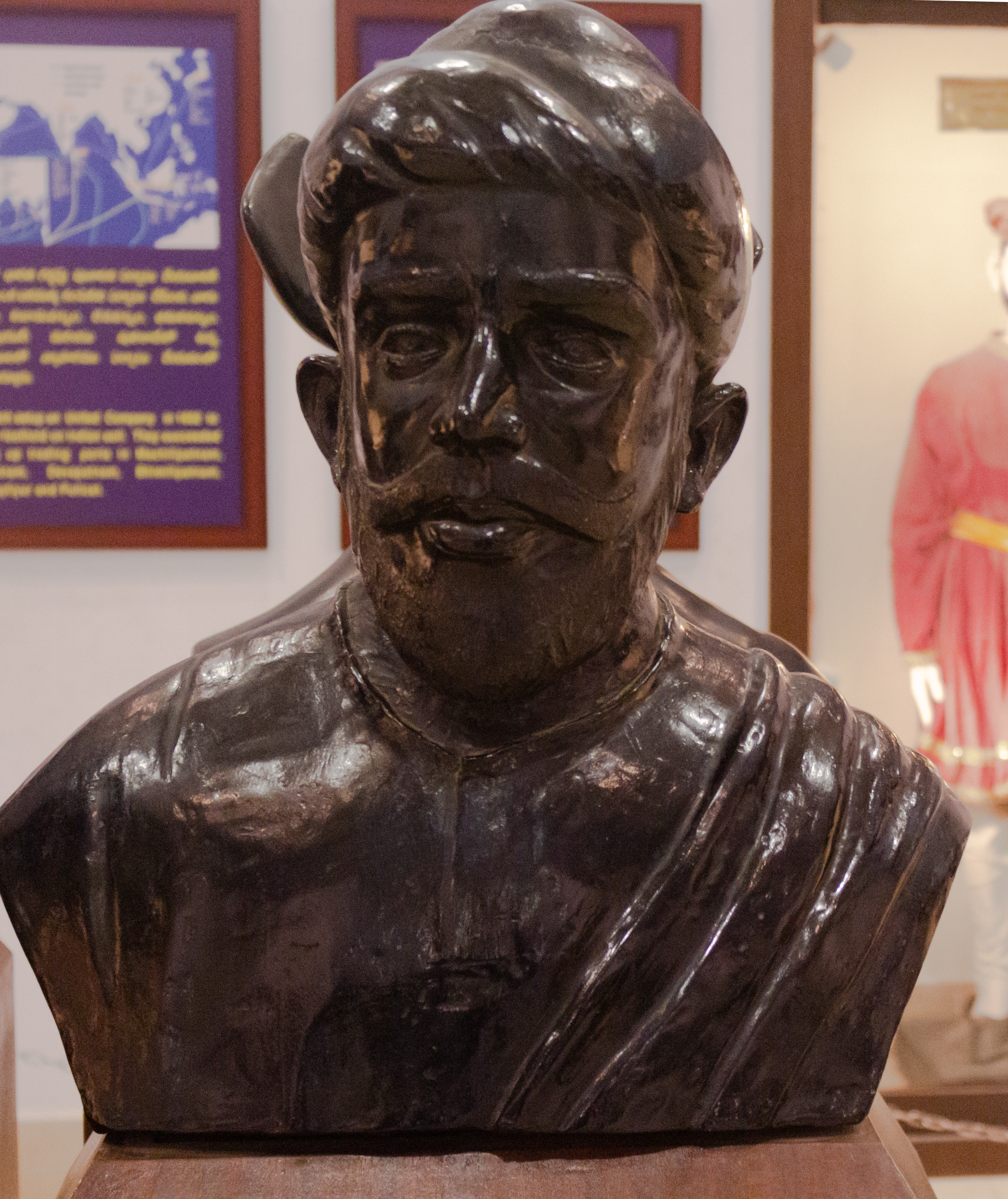
Admiral Kunjali Marakkar

Some time in the 11th century, Marakkars become a prominent community in the city of Kochi. In Tamil Nadu, Marakkars are found in Kayalpattinam, Kilakarai, Adirampattinam, Thoothukudi, Nagore and Karaikal. Whether Marakkars are a community that moved from Tamil Nadu to Kerala, or from Kerala to Tamil Nadu remains an unsettled question. Some time later, they migrate to Ponnani in the Zamorin's dominion, where they worked as the admirals of the Zamorin's fleet. There is some evidence that Marakkars cooperated and conducted business with the Portuguese Armada. Soon after, the Marakkar fleet and the Portuguese Armada made war for a hundred years under the leadership of Admiral Kunjali Marakkar.

== Language ==
Today, they use Malayalam and Tamil as their primary language, with influence from Arabic. Many Arabic and Arabized words exist in Malayalam and Tamil, spoken by Marakkars. Among many examples, greetings and blessings are exchanged in Arabic instead of Malayalam/Tamil, such as Assalamu Alaikum instead of Shaanthiyum Samadanavum, Jazakallah instead of Nanni/Nandri and Pinjhan/Finjan/Pinjaanam for Bowl/Cup.

There are also words which are unique to Marakkars and Sri Lankan Moors, such as Laatha for elder-sister, Kaka for elder-brother, Umma for mother and Vappa for father, suggesting a close relationship between Marakkars of India and Marrakkar and Moors of Sri Lanka. The Marakkars of Sri Lanka falls under the 'Sri Lankan Moors group, defined by the Sri Lankan government as a separate ethnic group. There are also words from the Purananuru era, such as Aanam for Kulambu and Puliaanam for rasam or soup.

| English | Malayalam/Tamil | Marakkar Malayalam/Tamil |
| Father | Appan/Appa | Uppa/Vaapa |
| Mother | Amma | Umma |
| Brother | Chetan/Annan | Kaaka/Naana |
| Sister | Chechi/Akka | Thaatha/Laatha |
| Son | makan | mon/mavan |
| Daughter | makal | mol/maval |

== See also ==
- A. P. J. Abdul Kalam
- Tamil Muslims
- Mappila Muslims
- Sri Lankan Moors
