= Sathurukondan =

- Village
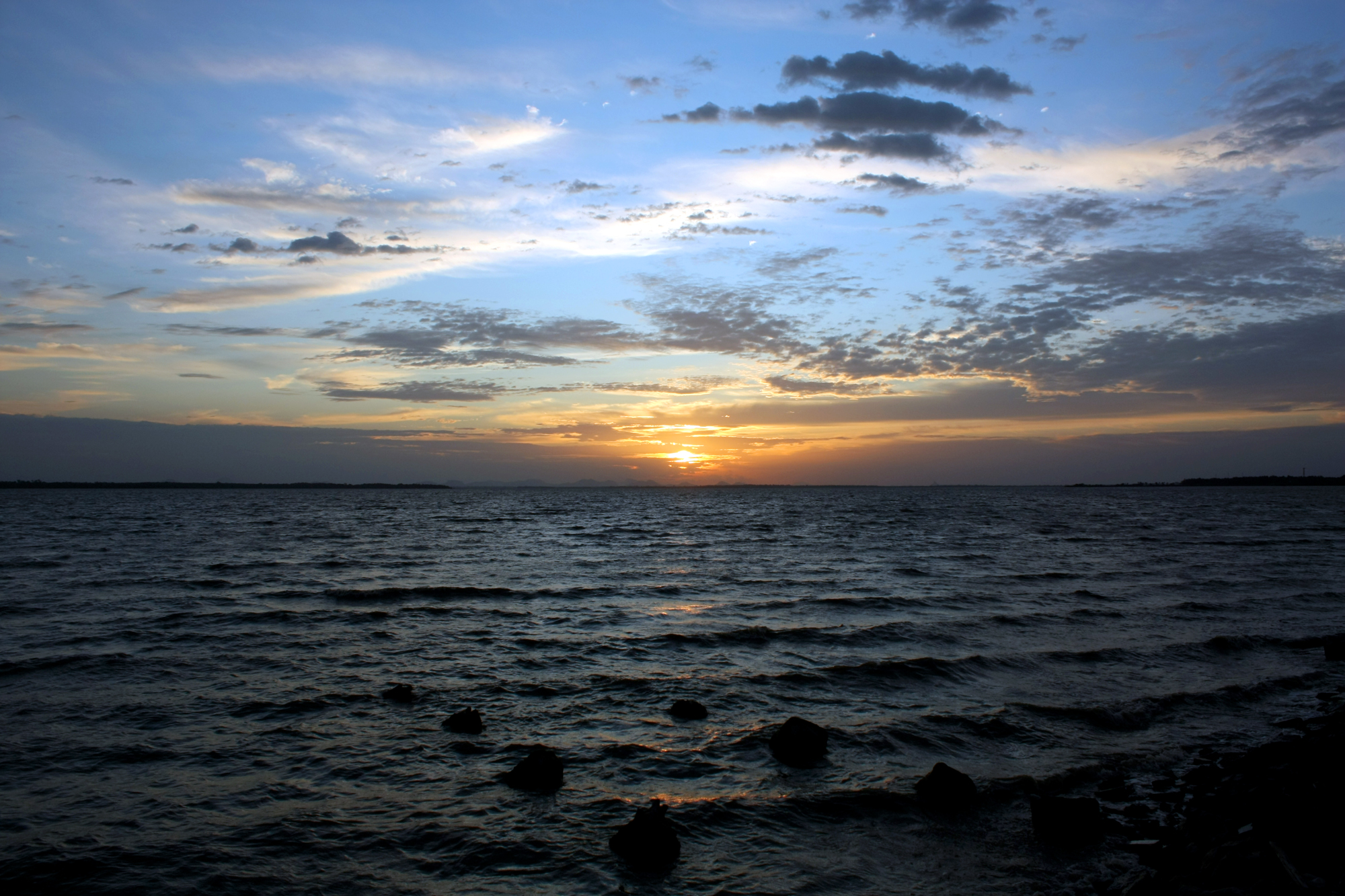

- Location within Sri Lanka
- Coordinates: 7°40′0″N 81°42′0″E
- Country: Sri Lanka
- Province: Eastern Province
- Time zone: UTC+5:30 (Sri Lanka Standard Time Zone)
  - Summer (DST): UTC+6

Sathurukondan is a village situated in the eastern Batticaloa District of Sri Lanka. It lies close to the regional capital of Batticaloa. Most of its inhabitants are minority Sri Lankan Tamils.
