= Mukkuvar (India) =

Indian caste mainly on the Malabar coast of India

- Religions: Hinduism, Christianity, Islam
- Languages: Tamil, Malayalam
- Subdivisions: Northern division: Nalillakkar – Ponillam, Chembillam, Karillam, Kachillam; Southern division: Munillakkar – Chembillam, Karillam, Kachillam
- Related groups: Sri Lankan Mukkuvar, Mogaveera

The Mukkuvar are a maritime ethnic group found in the Indian states of Kerala, Tamil Nadu and the Eastern and North Western coastal regions of Sri Lanka. They are mostly found on the Malabar Coast, and Kanyakumari district, Tamil Nadu, who have traditionally been involved in fishing and other maritime activities.

== Etymology ==
The caste name proposes several etymology theories. The peoples in the coastal region of Malabar under the Chera dynasty used to sink enemy and pirate ships. Hence, they got the name Mukkuvar. Mukku or mukkuka in Tamil and Malayalam means “dip”. The Patitrupattu describes the attack on the enemy ship by Cheran Chenkuttuvan, which refers the skills used by mukkuvars to sunk and attack the enemy ships. Other titles used by the community are Kukankulam, Murkukan and Mukkiyar.

The Mukkuvars are divided into exogamous clans. A clan is known as llam, meaning "house". The Mukkuvars of Northern Malabar are known as Nalillakkar (meaning "of the four illams") consisted of the clans known as Ponillam (from pon meaning "gold"), Chembillam (from chembu meaning "copper"), Karillam and Kachillam. The Mukkuvars of Southern Malabar have only three clans, with the absence of Ponillam, and are therefore known as Munillakar (meaning "of the three illams").

== History ==
=== Early history ===
The Mukkuvars historically were inhabitants of the Neithal (coastal) lands of Malabar coast in Chera kingdom. As suggested by their name, they were involved in diving to sunk the enemy ships during the Chera dynasty. They were maritime inhabitants of the Malabar Coast, who were involved in naval activities, boatbuilding, fishing, among other maritime activities.

Mukkuvars were brought into the Vizhinjam region by the Chera and Venad Kings to attack Raja Raja Cholan's navy ships during the 10th century, when the Cholas conquered Vizhinjam and Kollam. Thus the Mukkuvars from present-day Malappuram, Kozhikode and Kannur districts migrated to the Venad region (present-day Thiruvananthapuram, Kollam, and Kanyakumari districts) and few settled over there. Mukkuvars were hired as mercenaries in Sri Lanka from 12th century and few settled there from then. According to the legend of the Mukkuvar from Kerala, they emigrated to and from Sri Lanka. The Mattakallappu Manmiyam text and other local palm-leaf manuscripts in Sri Lanka attribute the emigration of the Sri Lankan Mukkuvar from South India under the rule of Kalinga Magha in 12th century AD, who delegates the power to local petty kings whose successors are identified as belonging to Kukankulam.

=== Medieval history ===
In the 8th century mercantile Arabs made appearances in Kerala, where they, among others, married natives such as those from the Mukkuvar community and formed social groups such as the Mappilas. The Mukkuvars were, in addition to fishing and seafaring, involved in warfare. Later rulers such as the Zamorin of Calicut promoted Mukkuvars in conversion to Islam in order to man their navies. Up to 1000 AD were the Mukkuvars recruited to the naval fleets of the Chera dynasty. South Indian communities were often invited to Sri Lanka as mercenaries. The Sinhala text known as Dambadeni Asna refers to Mukkuvar warriors serving in the army of Parakramabahu II of Dambadeniya. As mentioned in Mattakallappu Manmiyam, they too served in the 13th century in the army of the invader Kalinga Magha, who seized control of northern and eastern parts of Sri Lanka. The Mukkuvars from Kerala whose descendants are the Sri Lankan Mukkuvars were made chieftains (Vanniar) in the Batticaloa region under Kalinga Magha, where they also formed matrilineal landlords known as Podiyar and exhibited significant political domination. The Mukkuvars, in alliance with the Arabs, encamped at the Puttalam region where, in a campaign initiated by Parakramabahu VI of Kotte, they battled and were chased away by Karaiyar mercenaries, mentioned in the Mukkara Hatana (which means ‘Mukkuvar war’). Mukkuvar women intermarried with their allied Arabs, whose descendants reside in the Sri Lankan Moor ethnicity.
