= Mukkara Hatana =

Palm leaf manuscript from Sri Lanka

The Mukkara Hatana ("The Mukkuvar War") is a 17th-century palm-leaf manuscript from Sri Lanka. Written in Sinhalese, the work celebrates the victory of the Karaiyars, also known as Karavas, over the Sri Lankan Mukkuvars, who battled for the dominance of the western coast of Sri Lanka. The manuscript is now preserved in the Hugh Nevill collection at the British Museum.

== Plot ==
The victory of the Karaiyars over the Mukkuvars happened in the Saka era 1159, corresponding to the 15th century. About 7700 Karaiyar chieftains from Kanchipuram, Kaveripattinam and Kilakarai of Tamil Nadu arrived in Sri Lanka at the invitation of Parakramabahu VI of Kotte. The army was led by the chieftains Kurukula Nattu Thevar, Adiarasa Adappan, Varunasuriya Adappan, Kurukulasuriya Mudaliya, Bharathakulasuriya Mudaliyar, Arasakulasuriya Mudaliyar and their main royal chief, Manikka Thalaivan.

The chieftains first overthrew the fort of Puttalam after a three-month siege of the Mukkuvar led by Nala Mudaliyar. The Karaiyar chieftains thereafter proceeded to Nagapattinam and overthrew the fort there after another four months siege with the loss of additional 1300 troops, where also their royal Karaiyar leader, Manikka Thalaivan got killed.

Manikka Thalaivan's sons were eventually adopted by Parakramabahu VI, one of whom is known as Sapumal Kumaraya.

They lost 1,500 of their own troops. The chieftains settled after the victory in the area between Chilaw and Negombo.

== See also ==
- Timeline of the Karavas
