= List of Tamil monarchs =

List of Tamil speaking monarchs around the world

This is a list of ethnically Tamil and predominantly Tamil speaking monarchs, who ruled in Southern India and parts of Sri Lanka and Southeast Asia. The ancient Tamil monarchy was largely hereditary and supported by numerous chieftains.

== Tamil royal titles ==
- Tribhuvana Chakravarti/Chakravarti(Emperor)
- Perarasi/Mahadevi (Empress)
- Devar (King)
- Devi/kundhi (Queen)
- Ko, Arasan, Mannan, Aliyan or Araiyan (head of stamping)
- Arasi (Queen)
- Ilavarasi or Piratti (Princess)
- Ilam-Ko or Ilavarasan (Prince)
- Kuru-nila Mannan or Chittrarasan (Regional King)
- Chittrarasi (Regional Queen)

== Three Crowned Kings ==
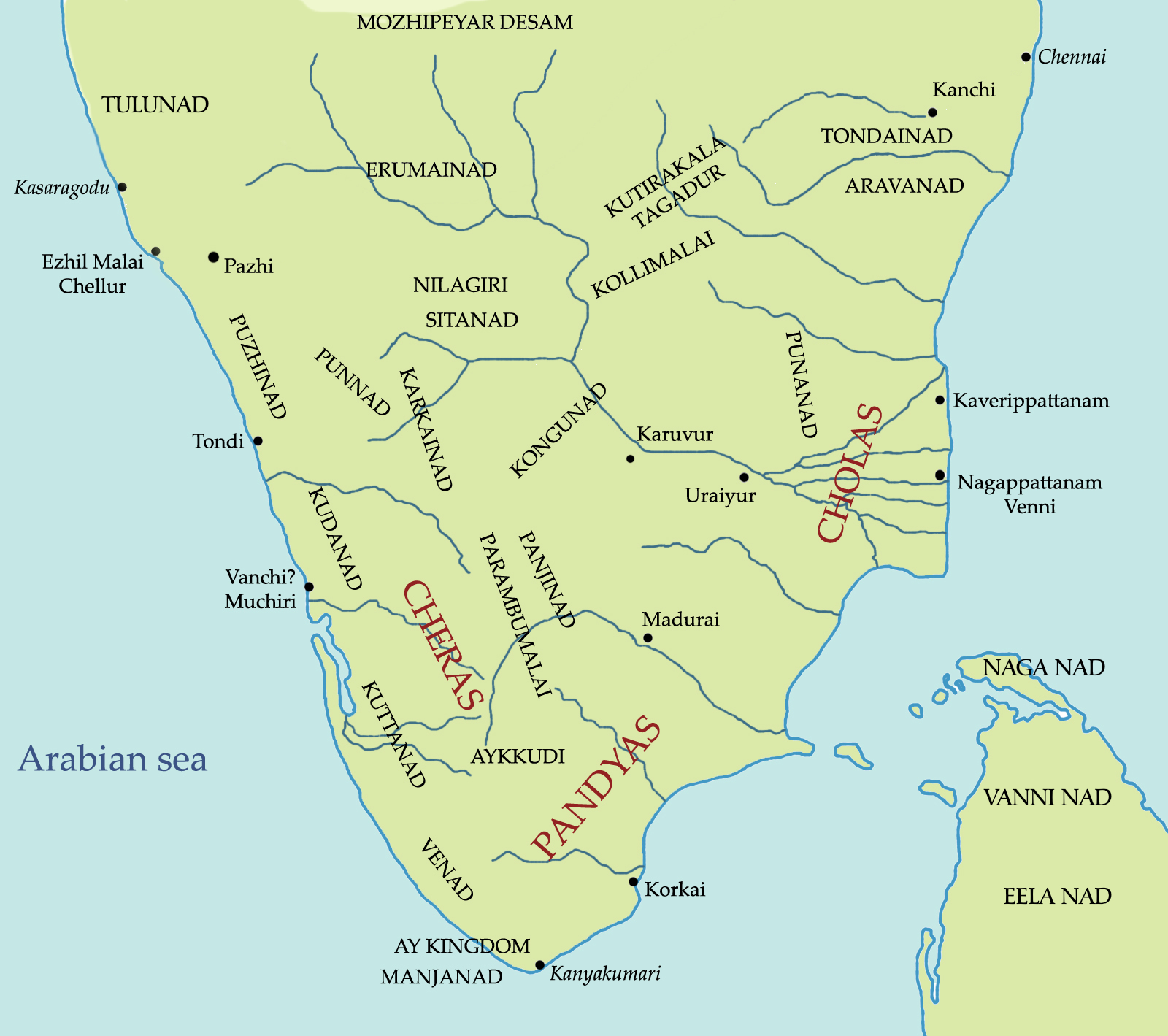
Tamilakam in the Sangam Period.

The three crowned kings known as Muvendar were the traditional three Tamil dynasties that ruled the Tamilakam since the Sangam era.

- Chera
- Chola
- Pandyan

== Pandyan dynasty (c. 600 BCE – 1620 CE) ==
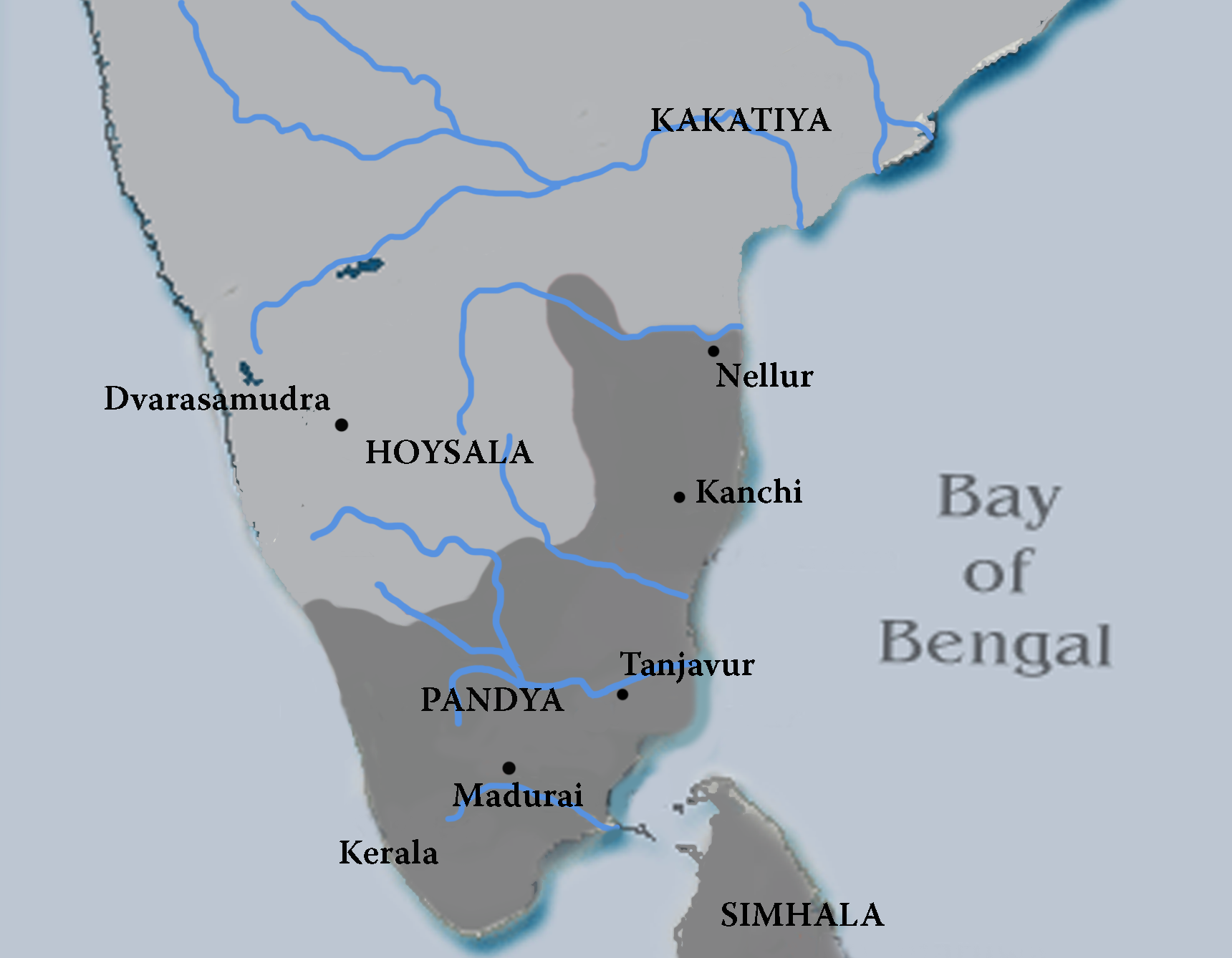
Pandyan Empire at greatest extent

=== Early Pandyans (c. 6th century BCE – 3rd century CE) ===
- Koon Pandiyan (ta:அரிகேசரி)
- Nedunjeliyan I (he was mentioned in legend of Kannagi)
- Pudappandiyan
- Mudukudumi Peruvazhudhi
- Nedunjeliyan II
- Nanmaran
- Nedunjeliyan III
- Maran Vazhudhi
- Kadalan Vazhudhi
- Mutriya Chezhiyan
- Ukkirap Peruvazhudhi

=== Imperial Pandyans (590–920 CE) ===
- Kadungon (590–620 CE)
- Maravarman Avani Culamani (620-645 CE)
- Jayantavarman (645-670 CE)
- Arikesari Maravarman Nindraseer Nedumaaran (670–710 CE)
- Kochadaiyan Ranadhiran (710–735 CE)
- Arikesari Parankusa Maravarman Rajasimha I (735–765 CE)
- Parantaka Nedunjadaiyan (765–815 CE)
- Rasasingan II (790–800) CE
- Varagunan I (800–830 CE)
- Srimara Srivallabha (815–862 CE)
- Varagunavarman II (862–880 CE)
- Parantaka Viranarayana (880–900 CE)
- Maravarman Rajasimha II (900–920 CE)

=== Pandyans under Chola empire (920–1216 CE) ===
- Sundara Pandyan I (920 CE)
- Veera Pandyan I
- Veera Pandyan II
- Amarabhujanga Tivrakopa
- Jatavarman Sundara Chola Pandyan
- Maravarman Vikrama Chola Pandyan
- Maravarman Parakrama Chola Pandyan
- Jatavarman Chola Pandya
- Seervallabha Manakulachala (1101–1124)
- Maaravaramban Seervallaban (1132–1161)
- Parakrama Pandyan I (1161–1162 CE)
- Kulasekara Pandyan III
- Vira Pandyan III
- Jatavarman Srivallaban (1175–1180 CE)
- Jatavarman Kulasekaran I (1190–1216 CE)

=== Later Pandyans (1212–1345 CE) ===
- Parakrama Pandyan II (1212–1215 CE)
- Maravarman Sundara Pandyan (1216–1238 CE)
- Sadayavarman Kulasekaran II (1238–1240 CE)
- Maravarman Sundara Pandyan II (1238–1251 CE)
- Jatavarman Sundara Pandyan (1251–1268 CE)
- Maaravarman Kulasekara Pandyan I (1268–1308 CE)
- Sundara Pandyan IV (1309–1327 CE)
- Vira Pandyan IV (1309–1345 CE)

=== Tenkasi Pandyans (1422–1620 CE) ===
During the 15th century, the Pandyans lost their traditional capital city Madurai to Delhi Sultanate, and were forced to move their capital to Tirunelveli in southern Tamilakam and existed there as vassals.

- Cataiyavarman Parakrama Pandyan (1422–1463 CE)
- Cataiyavarman III Kulasekara Pandyan (1429–1473 CE)
- Azhagan Perumal Parakrama Pandyan (1473–1506 CE)
- Kulasekara Pandyan (1479–1499 CE)
- Cataiyavarman Civallappa Pandyan (1534–1543 CE)
- Parakrama Kulasekara Pandyan (1543–1552 CE)
- Nelveli Maran (1552–1564 CE)
- Cataiyavarman Adiveerama Pandyan (1564–1604 CE)
- Varathunga Pandyan (1588–1612 CE)
- Varakunarama Pandyan (1613–1618 CE)
- Kollankondan ( Approx 1620 CE)

Mutharaiyar (raiyar)(600 and 850 CE)

Mutharaiyar dynasty is one of the royal dynasty in Tamil Nadu state of India. Mutharaiyars ruled Tanjore, Trichy and Pudukottai regions from 600 CE to 850 CE.

Admirable accounts of Mutharaiyar kings are found in the Tamil epics Nālaṭiyār and Muthollaayiram

Kuvavan Maaran alias Perumbidugu Mutharaiyar I (650-680 CE)

Maaran Parameswaran alias Ilangovadiaraiyan (680 -705 CE)

Suvaran Maran alias Perumbidugu Mutharaiyar II (705-745 CE)

Videlviduku Satan Maran(745 -770 CE)

Peradiarayan alias Marbiduku(770-791 CE)

Kuvavan Satan alias Videlviduku Mutharaiyar(791 -826 CE)

sandhan Pailiili(826 -851 CE)

== Chola dynasty (c. 300 BCE – 1280 CE) ==
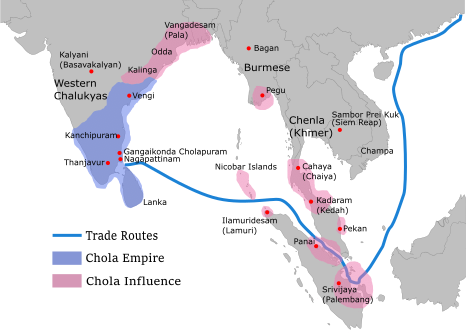
Chola Empire at greatest extent

=== Early Chola rulers (c. 300 BCE – 850 CE) ===
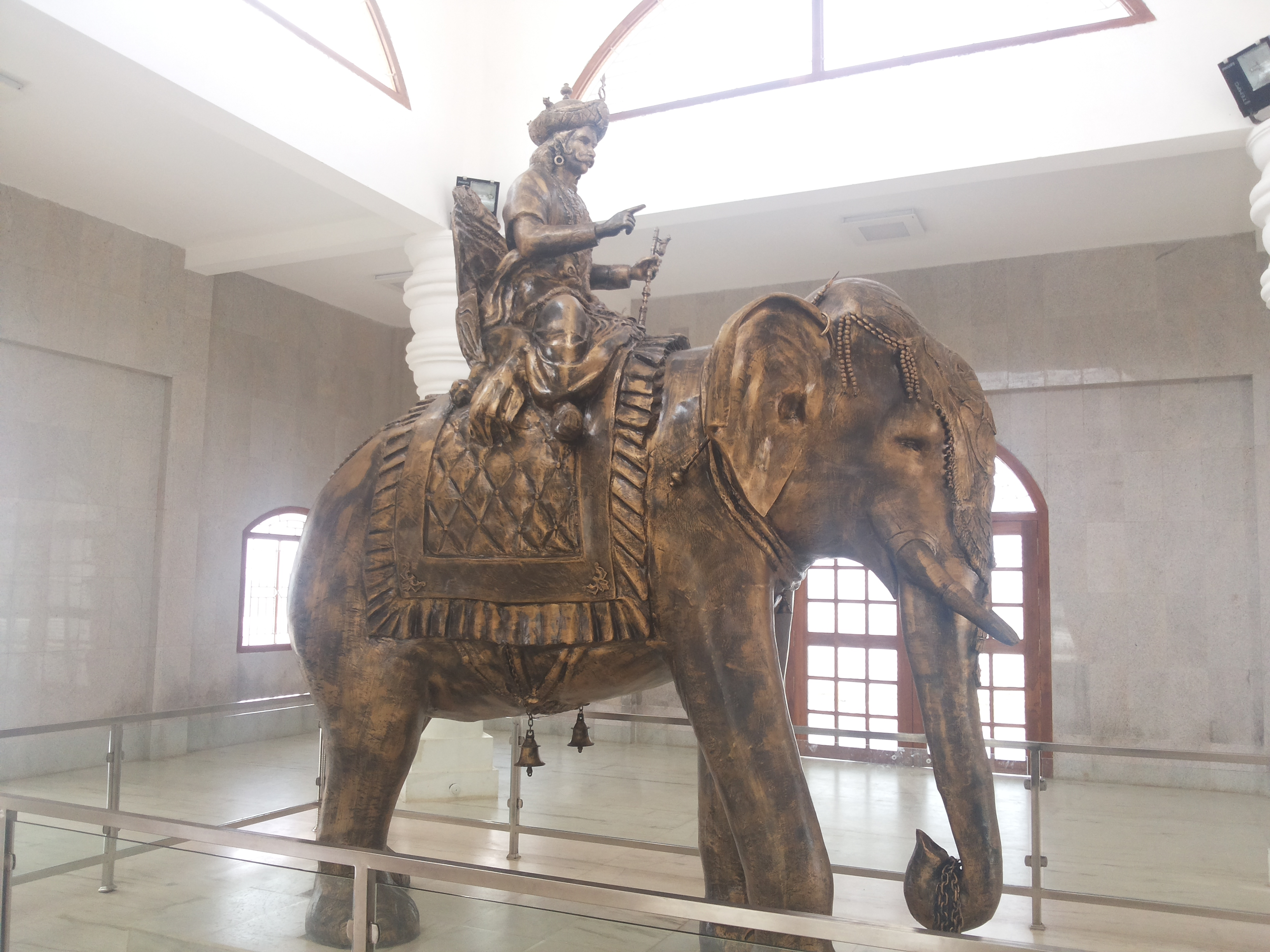
A bronze statue of Karikalan.

- Ellalan
- Kulakkottan
- Ilamcetcenni
- Karikalan
- Nedunkilli
- Nalankilli
- Killivalavan
- Kopperuncholan
- Kocengannan
- Perunarkilli

=== Imperial Chola Empire (850–1279 CE) ===
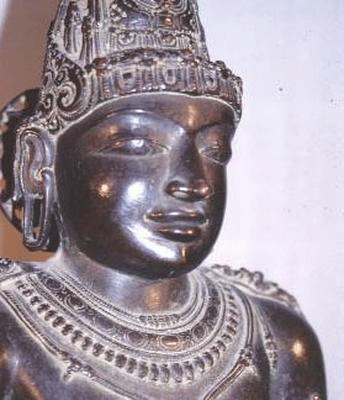
A sculpture of Rajaraja Chola I.

- Vijayalaya Chola (848–881)
- Aditya (871–907)
- Parantaka I (907–955)
- Gandaraditya (950–957)
- Arinjaya (956–957)
- Parantaka Chola II (957–970)
- Uttama Chola (973–985)
- Rajaraja Chola I (985–1014)
- Rajendra Chola I (1014–1044)
- Rajadhiraja Chola I (1018–1054)
- Rajendra Chola II (1054–1063)
- Virarajendra Chola (1063–1070)
- Athirajendra Chola (1067–1070)
- Kulottunga Chola I (1071–1122)
- Vikrama Chola (1118–1135)
- Kulothunga Chola II (1133–1150)
- Rajaraja Chola II (1146–1163)
- Rajadiraja Chola II (1163–1178)
- Kulottunga Chola III (1178–1218)
- Rajaraja Chola III (1216–1246)
- Rajendra Chola III (1246–1279), last of the imperial Cholas

== Chera dynasty (c. 300 BCE – 1528 CE) ==
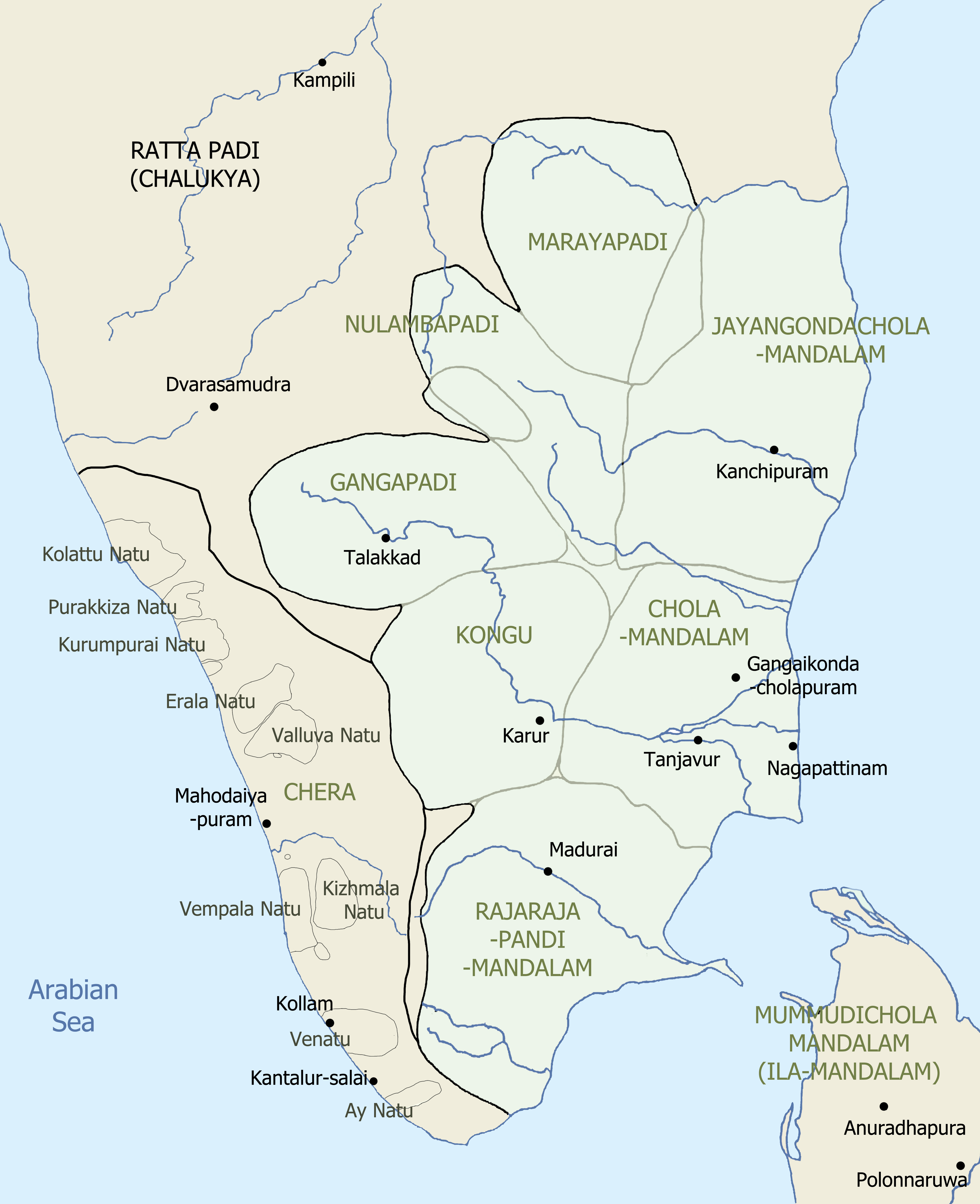
South India and location of Cheras in west

=== Early Chera kingdom (c. 3rd century BCE – 4th century CE) ===
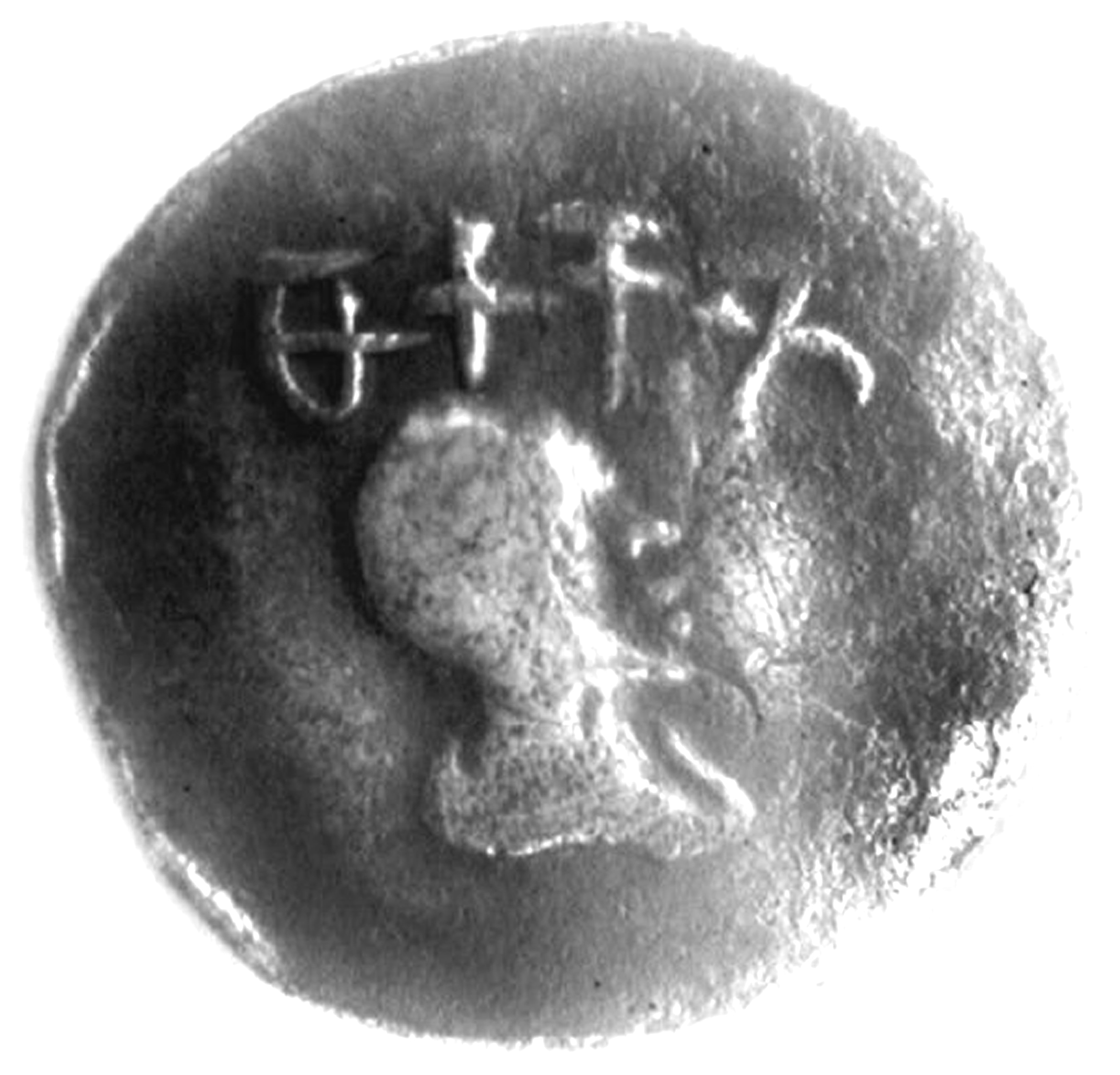
A Chera coin with legend "Makkotai"

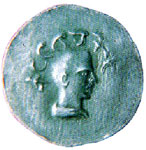
A Chera coin with legend "Kuttuvan Kotai"

- Uthiyan Cheral Athan
- Nedum Cheral Athan
- Palyani Sel Kelu Kuttuvan
- Narmudi Cheral
- Vel Kelu Kuttuvan (Senguttuvan Chera)
- Adu Kottu Pattu Cheral Athan
- Selva Kadumko Valia Athan
- Anthuvan Cheral
- Perum Cheral Irumporai
- Illam Cheral Irumporai
- Mantharan Cheral Irumporai
- Kanaikkal Irumporai

==== From inscriptions ====
- Ko Athan Cheral Irumporai
- Perum Kadungo Irumporai
- Ilam Kadungo Irumporai
- Kadummi Pudha Chera

==== From inscribed coins ====
- Mak-kothai
- Kuttuvan Kothai
- Kollippurai/Kollippurai
- Kol Irumporai
- Sa Irumporai

=== Kongu Chera dynasty (c. 400–844 CE) ===
- Ravi Kotha
- Kantan Ravi
- Vira Kotha
- Vira Narayana
- Vira Chola
- Vira Kerala
- Amara Bhujanga Deva
- Kerala Kesari Adhirajaraja Deva

=== Chera Perumal dynasty of Makotai (c. 844–1124 CE) ===
- Sthanu Ravi Kulasekhara (844–870 CE)
  - Kulasekhara Alvar/Kulasekhara Varma
- Rama Rajasekhara (870–883 CE)
  - Cheraman Perumal Nayanar
- Vijayaraga (883–895 CE)
- Kotha Kotha Kerala Kesari (895–905 CE)
- Kotha Ravi (905–943 CE)
- Indu Kotha (943–962 CE)
- Bhaskara Ravi Manukuladithya (962–1021 CE)
- Ravi Kotha Rajasimha (1021–1036 CE)
- Raja Raja (1036–1089 CE)
- Ravi Rama Rajadithya (1036–1089 CE)
- Adithyan Kotha Ranadithya (1036–1089 CE)
- Rama Kulasekhara (1089–1122 CE)
- Kotha Varma Marthandam (1122–1124 CE)

=== Venadu Chera/Kulasekhara dynasty (c. 1124–1528 CE) ===
- Vira Kerala Varma I (1124–1145 CE)
- Kodai Kerala Varma (1145–1150 CE)
- Vira Ravi Varma (1145–1150 CE)
- Vira Kerala Varma II (1164–1167 CE)
- Vira Aditya Varma (1167–1173 CE)
- Vira Udaya Martanda Varma (1173–1192 CE)
- Devadaram Vira Kerala Varma III (1192–1195 CE)
- Vira Manikantha Rama Varma Tiruvadi (1195– ?)
- Vira Rama Kerala Varma Tiruvadi (1209–1214 CE)
- Vira Ravi Kerala Varma Tiruvadi (1214–1240 CE)
- Vira Padmanabha Martanda Varma Tiruvadi (1240–1252 CE)
- Ravi Varma (1299–1313 CE)
- Vira Udaya Martanda Varma (1313–1333 CE)
- Aditya Varma Tiruvadi (1333–1335 CE)
- Vira Rama Udaya Martanda Varma Tiruvadi (1335–1342 CE)
- Vira Kerala Varma Tiruvadi (1342–1363 CE)
- Vira Martanda Varma III (1363–1366 CE)
- Vira Rama Martanda Varma (1366–1382 CE)
- Vira Ravi Varma (1383–1416 CE)
- Vira Ravi Ravi Varma (1416–1417 CE)
- Vira Kerala Martanda Varma (1383 CE)
- Chera Udaya Martanda Varma (1383–1444 CE)
- Vira Ravi Varma (1444–1458 CE)
- Sankhara Sri Vira Rama Martanda Varma (1458–1468 CE)
- Vira Kodai Sri Aditya Varma (1468–1484 CE)
- Vira Ravi Ravi Varma (1484–1503 CE)
- Martanda Varma, Kulasekhara Perumal (1503–1504 CE)
- Vira Ravi Kerala Varma, Kulasekhara Perumal (1504–1528 CE)

== Pallava dynasty (c. 275–897 CE) ==
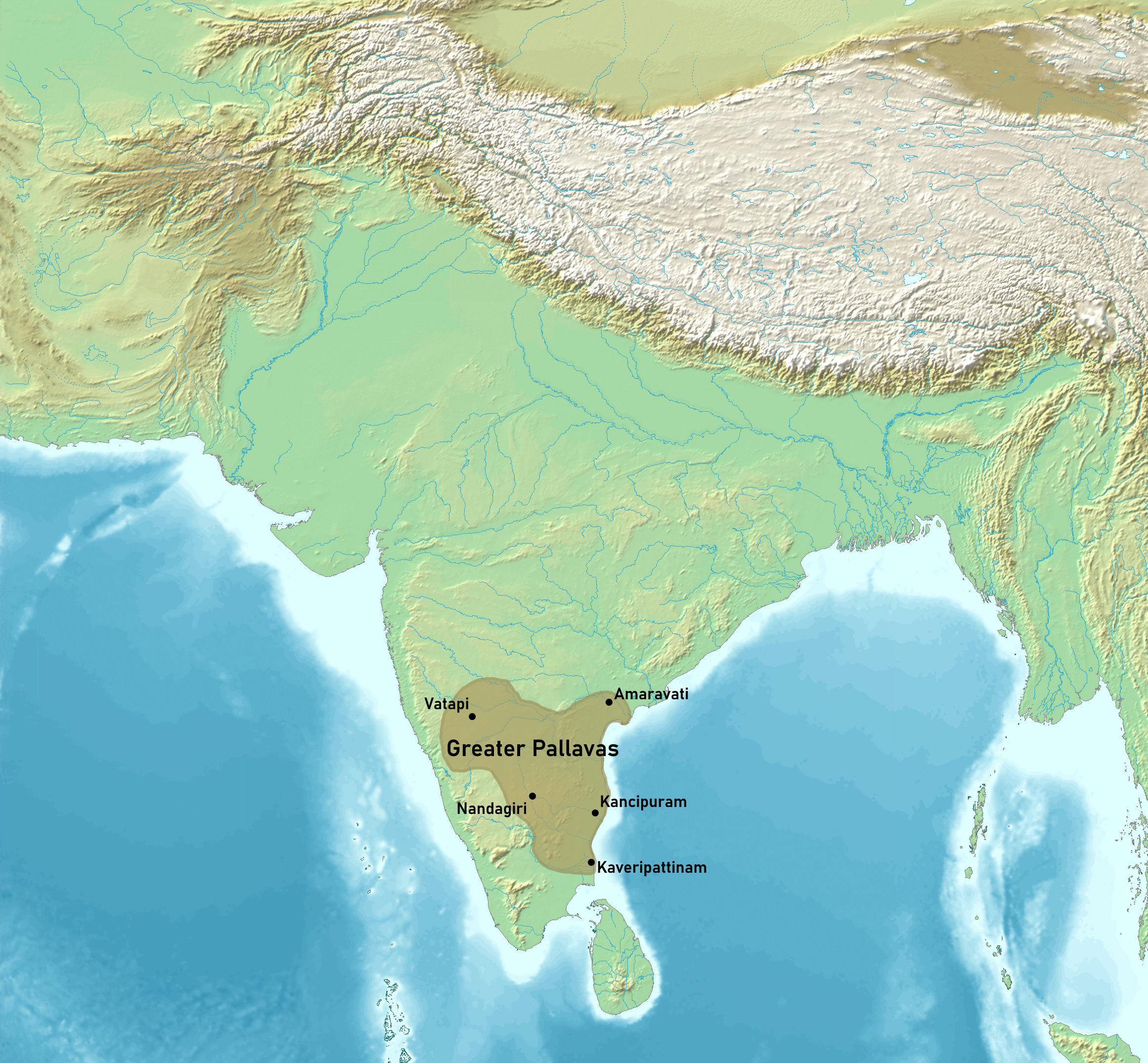
Greatest extent of Pallava Empire, during the reign of Narasimhavarman I (630-668 CE)

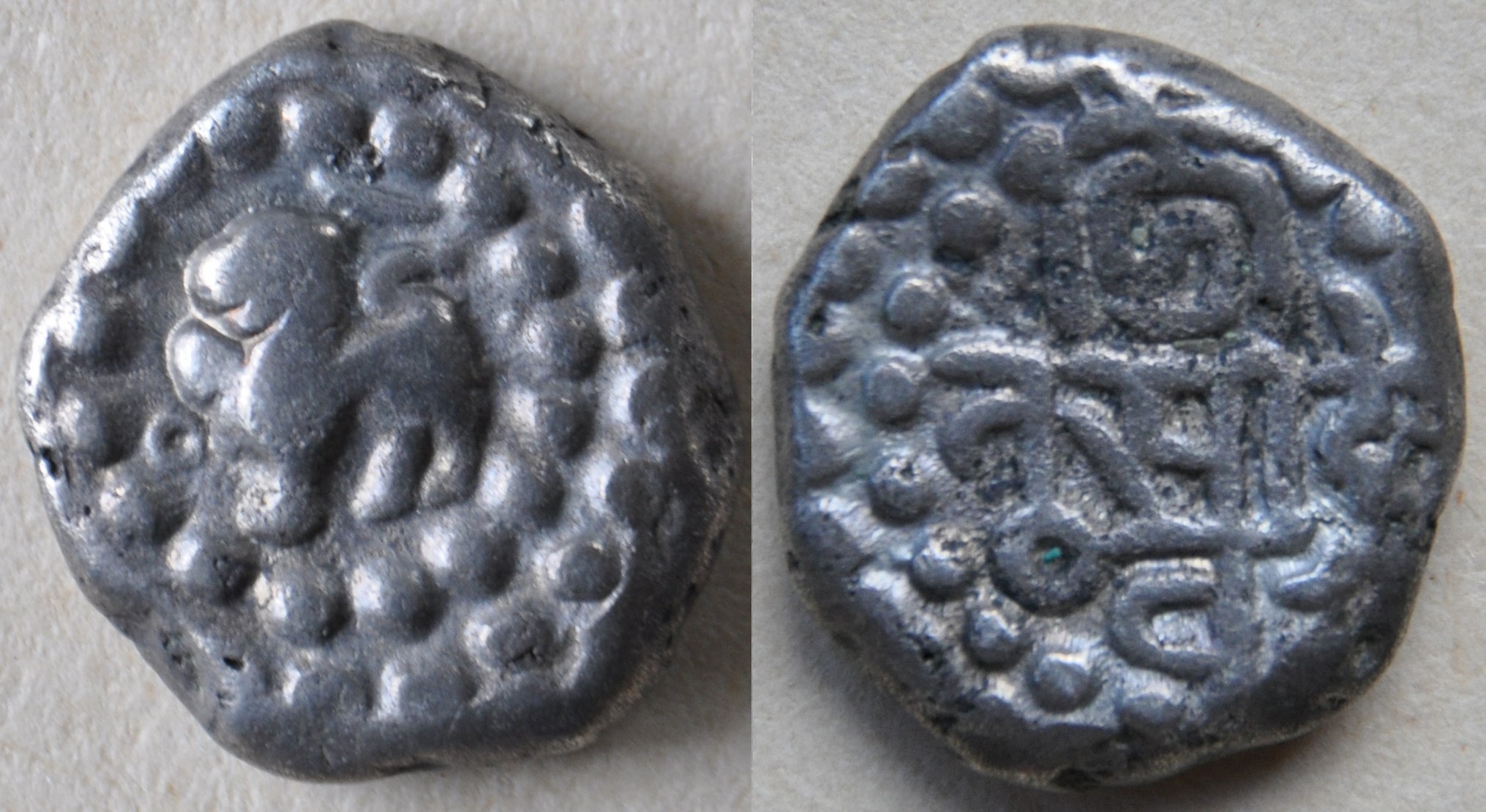
A Pallava coin with lion insigne of Narasimhavarman I.

=== Early Pallavas ===
- Virakurcha (275–300), founder of dynasty
- Simha Varman I, Provincial governor of Palnadu region of Andhra
- Siva Skanda Varman I (300–325)
- Buddhavarman (325–340)
- Vishnugopavarman (340–350)

=== Middle Pallavas ===
- Kumaravisnu I (c. 345–360)
- Skanda Varman II (c. 360–380)
- Vira Varman (c. 380–400)
- Skanda Varman III (c. 400–436)
- Simha Varman I (c. 436–477)
- Yuvamaharaja Vishnugopa, Brother of Simhavarman I, Provincial governor of Andhra
- Skanda Varman IV (c. 477–490)
- Nandi Varman I (c. 490–500)
- Kumaravisnu II (c. 500–510)
- Buddha Varman (c. 510–525)
- Kumaravisnu III (c. 525–545)

=== Later Pallavas ===
- Simha Varman III (c. 545–554)
- Simhavishnu (554–590)
- Mahendravarman I (590–630)
- Narasimhavarman I (Mamalla) (630–668)
- Mahendravarman II (668–669)
- Paramesvaravarman I (669–691)
- Narasimhavarman II (Raja Simha) (691–728)
- Paramesvaravarman II (728–731)
- Nandivarman II (Pallavamalla) (731–796)
- Dantivarman (775–825)
- Nandivarman III (825–869)
- Nirupathungan (869–882)
- Aparajitavarman (882–897), last Pallava ruler

== Ay chieftains ==
=== Ay chieftains (early historic) ===
- Ay Andiran
- Ay Titiyan (the Podiyil Chelvan)
- Ay Atiyan

=== Medieval Ay kings ===
- Chadayan Karunanthan
- Karunanthadakkkan Srivallabha (r. 856–884 CE)
- Vikramaditya Varaguna (r. 884–911 CE)

== Mushika Rulers ==
=== Early rulers ===
- Ezhimala Nannan

=== Medieval rulers ===
- Validhara Vikkirama Rama (c. 929 CE)
- Kantan Karivarman alias Iramakuta Muvar (c. 1020 CE)
- Mushikesvara Chemani/Jayamani (c. 1020 CE)
- Utaiya-varma alias Ramakuta Muvar (early 12th century CE)

== Kadava Chieftains (c.1216-1279 CE) ==
- Kopperunchinga I (1216 - 1246 CE)
- Kopperunchinga II (1243 - 1279 CE)

== Jaffna Kings (c. 1215–1619 CE) ==
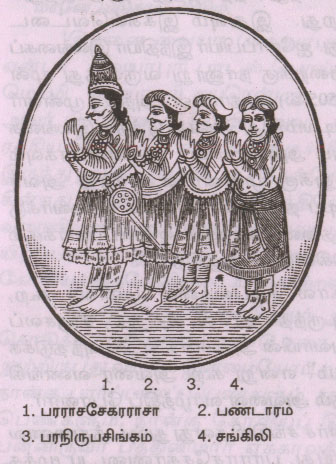
Image of Singai Parasasekaran, his sons Pandaram, Paranirupsingan and Cankili I

- Kalinga Magha (1215-1255)
- Chandrabhanu (1255-1261)
- Senthamaithan (1261-1277)
- Kulasekara Cinkaiariyan (1277–1284)
- Kulotunga Cinkaiariyan (1284–1292)
- Vickrama Cinkaiariyan (1292–1302)
- Varodaya Cinkaiariyan (1302–1325)
- Martanda Cinkaiariyan (1325–1348)
- Gunabhooshana Cinkaiariyan (1348–1371)
- Virodaya Cinkaiariyan (1371–1380)
- Jeyaveera Cinkaiariyan (1380–1410)
- Gunaveera Cinkaiariyan (1410–1440)
- Kanakasooriya Cinkaiariyan (1440–1450 & 1467–1478)
- Singai Pararasasegaram (1478–1519)
- Cankili I (1519–1561)
- Puviraja Pandaram (1561–1565 & 1582–1591)
- Kasi Nayinar Pararacacekaran (1565–1570)
- Periyapillai (1565–1582)
- Ethirimana Cinkam (1591–1617)
- Cankili II Cekaracacekaran (1617–1619)

== Rajahs of Ramnad (c. 1601–1949 CE) ==
List of Sethupathi rulers

=== Chieftains With the Madurai Nayaks (c. 1601–1677) ===
- Udaiyan Sethupathi (Sadaikkan) (1601–1623)
- Koottan Sethupathi (1623–1635)
- Dalavai Raghunatha Sethupathi (1635–1645)
- Thirumalai Raghunatha Sethupathi (1646–1676)
- Raja Suriya Sethupathi (1676)
- Aathana Raghunatha Sethupathi (1677)

=== Imperial rulers (c. 1678–1795 CE) ===
- Raghunatha Kilavan Sethupathi (1678–1710)
- Muthu Vairavanatha Sethupathi I (1710–1712)
- Vijaya Raghunatha Sethupathi (1713–1725)
- Sundaresvara Raghunatha Sethupathi (1725)
- Bavani Sangara Sethupathi (1725–1727)
- Kumara Muthu Vijaya Raghunatha Sethupathi (1728–1735)
- Sivakumara Muthu Vijaya Raghunatha Sethupathi (1735–1747)
- Rakka Thevar Sethupathi (1748)
- Sella Muthu Vijaya Raghunatha Sethupathi (1749–1762)
- Muthuramalinga Vijaya Ragunatha Sethupathi I (1762–1772 or 1781–1795)

=== Rulers of princely state under British Raj (c. 1795–1949 CE) ===
==== As King ====
- Mangaleswari Nachiyar (1795–1803)

==== As Zamindars ====
- Mangaleswari Nachiyar (1803–1807)
- Annaswami Sethupathi (1807–1820)
- Ramaswami Sethupathi (1820–1830)
- Muthu Chella Thevar Sethupathi (1830–1846)
- Parvatha Vardhani Ammal Nachchiyar (1846–1862)
- Muthuramalinga Sethupathi II (1862–1873)
- Court of Wards (1873–1889)
- Bhaskara Sethupathy (1889–1903)
- Dinakara Sethupathy
- Raja Rajeswara Sethupathi (1903–1929)
- Shanmugha Rajeswara Sethupathi (1929–1949)

== Rajahs of Pudukkottai (c. 1686–1948 CE) ==
- Raghunatha Raya Tondaiman (1686–1730), first ruler
- Vijaya Raghunatha Raya Tondaiman I (1730–1769)
- Raya Raghunatha Tondaiman (1769–December 1789)
- Vijaya Raghunatha Tondaiman (December 1789–February 1, 1807)
- Vijaya Raghunatha Raya Tondaiman II (February 1, 1807–June 1825)
- Raghunatha Tondaiman (June 1825–July 13, 1839)
- Ramachandra Tondaiman (July 13, 1839 – April 15, 1886)
- Martanda Bhairava Tondaiman (April 15, 1886 – May 28, 1928)
- Rajagopala Tondaiman (October 28, 1928 – August 15, 1947), last ruler

== Rajahs of Sivaganga (CE 1725–1947 CE) ==
- Muthu Vijaya Raghunatha Periyavudaya Thevar (1725–1750), first ruler
- Muthu Vaduganatha Periyavudaya Thevar (1750–1780)
- Velu Nachiyar (1780–1790)
- Vellacci (1790–1793)
- Vangam Periya Udaya Thevar (1793–1801), last ruler

== Velir Rulers ==
- Athiyamān
- Athiyamān Nedumān Añci
- Irunkōvēl
- Malaiyamān Thirumudi Kāri
- Malayamān
- Vaiyāvik Kōpperum Pēkan
- Vēl Pāri
- Ilanji Vel

== Later chieftains ==
- Dheeran Chinnamalai
- Puli Thevar
- Maruthu Pandiyar
- Maveeran Alagumuthu Kone

== Nayakar Kings ==
Nayaks, Nayakas or Nayakars were a Telugu-origin dynasty that established themselves after the fall of the Vijayanagara Empire as sovereign rulers of Tamil territories and replaced the indigenous Tamil dynasties like Cholas and Pandyans.

=== Gingee palyam (1509–1649 CE) ===
- Krishnappa Nayaka (1509–1521), first ruler
- Chennappa Nayaka
- Gangama Nayaka
- Venkata Krishnappa Nayaka
- Venkata Rama Bhupaala Nayaka
- Thriyambamka Krishnappa Nayaka
- Varadappa Nayaka
- Ramalinga Nayani vaaru
- Venkata Perumal Naidu
- Periya Ramabhadra Naidu
- Ramakrishnappa Naidu (d. 1649), last ruler

=== Madurai palayam (1529–1736 CE) ===
- Nagama Nayaka, first ruler
- Viswanatha Nayaka
- Vitthala Raja Nayaka (1546–1558)
- Kumara Krishnappa Nayaka (1563–1573)
- Muttu Krishnappa Nayaka (1602–1609)
- Muttu Virappa Nayaka (1609–1623)
- Tirumalai Nayaka (1623–1659)
- Muttu Alakadri Nayaka (1659–1662)
- Chokkanatha Nayaka (1662–1682)
- Rangakrishna Muthu Virappa Nayaka (1682–1689)
- Mangammal (1689–1704)
- Vijaya Ranga Chokkanatha Nayaka (1704–1731)
- Queen Meenakshi, and the End of the Nayakas (1731–1736), last ruler

=== Thanjavur palayam (1532–1673 CE) ===
- Sevappa Nayak (1532–1580), first ruler
- Achuthappa Nayak (1560–1614)
- Raghunatha Nayak (1600–1634)
- Vijaya Raghava Nayak (1634–1673), last ruler

=== Rajahs of Kandy (1739–1815 CE) ===
- Sri Vijaya Rajasinha (reigned 1739–1747), first ruler
- Kirti Sri Rajasinha
- Sri Rajadhi Rajasinha
- Sri Vikrama Rajasinha, last ruler

== Tamil Raiyars ==
- Bhuvanaikabahu VI of Kotte (aka Chempaha Perumal)
- Kadava dynasty
- Alagakkonara
- Sambuvaraya
- Akkarayan
- Pandara Vanniyan
- Magadai Mandalam
- Valvil Ori
- Sena and Guttika
- The Five Dravidians
- The Six Dravidians
- Valai Vannan (A Nakar king, who was mentioned in Manimekalai).
- Vallavaraiyan Vandiyadevan was a vassal and brother-in-law of Rajaraja Chola I.

== See also ==
- History of South India
- History of Tamil Nadu
- History of Kerala
- History of Sri Lanka
