= List of Jaffna monarchs =

King of Jaffna

Details
- First monarch: Kalinga Magha
- Last monarch: Cankili II
- Formed: 1215
- Abolished: 1619
- Residence: Nallur

The following is a list of monarchs of the Jaffna kingdom from 1215 with the invasion of Kalinga Magha to the Portuguese conquest of the Jaffna kingdom under Cankili II 1619.

== House of Kalinga Eastern Gangas (India) (1215–1255) ==
Portrait	Name	Birth	Death	King From	King Until	Relationship with Predecessor(s)
	Kalinga Magha (aka Kalinga Chodaganga or Gangaraja Kalinga Vijayabahu)	-	1255	1215	1255	He was of the Eastern Ganga dynasty, descendants of Kalinga Chandravamsa lineage and maternal lineage from Chola dynasty.

== Tambralinga (1255–1277) ==
Portrait	Name	Birth	Death	King From	King Until	Relationship with Predecessor(s)
	Chandrabhanu	-	1263	1255	1262	Of Padmavamsa dynasty, Tambralinga Malay invader, but submitted to Pandyan rule under king Sadayavarman Sundara Pandyan I
	Savakanmaindan		1277	1262	1277	Son of Chandrabhanu

== Aryacakravarti dynasty (1277–1450) ==
Portrait	Name	Birth	Death	King From	King Until	Relationship with Predecessor(s)
	Kulasekara Cinkaiariyan	-	1284	1277	1284	
	Kulotunga Cinkaiariyan	-	-	1284	1292	Son of Kulasekara Pararacacekaran I
	Vickrama Cinkaiariyan	-	-	1292	1302	Son of Kulottunga Cekaracacekaran II
	Varodaya Cinkaiariyan	-	1325	1302	1325	Son of Vikkrama Pararacacekaran II
	Martanda Cinkaiariyan	-	1348	1325	1348	Son of Varotaya Cekaracacekaran III
	Gunabhooshana Cinkaiariyan	-	-	1347	1371	Son of Marttanta Pararacacekaran III
	Virodaya Cinkaiariyan	-	-	1371	1380	Son of Kunapusana Cekaracacekaran IV
	Jeyaveera Cinkaiariyan	-	1410	1380	1410	Son of Virotaya Pararacacekaran IV
	Gunaveera Cinkaiariyan	-	-	1410	1440	Son of Jeyavira Cekaracacekaran V
	Kanakasooriya Cinkaiariyan	-	1478	1440	1450	Son of Kunavira Pararacacekaran V

== Kingdom of Kotte (1450–1467) ==
Portrait	Name	Birth	Death	King From	King Until	Relationship with Predecessor(s)
	Bhuvanekabahu VI (aka Chempaka Perumal)	-	1480	1450	1467	

== Aryacakravarti dynasty (restored) (1467–1619) ==
Portrait	Name	Birth	Death	King From	King Until	Relationship with Predecessor(s)
	Kanakasooriya Cinkaiariyan (restored)	-	1478	1467	1478	
	Singai Pararasasegaram	-	1519	1478	1519	Son of Cekaracacekaran V
	Cankili I	-	1565	1519	1561	Son of Singai Pararacacekaran VI
	Puviraja Pandaram	-	1591	1561	1565	Son of Cekaracacekaran VI
	Kasi Nayinar Pararacacekaran	-	1570	1565	1570	
	Periyapillai	-	1582	1565	1582	
	Puviraja Pandaram (restored)	-	1591	1582	1591	
	Ethirimana Cinkam	-	1617	1591	1617	Son of Pararacacekaran VII
	Cankili II	-	1619	1617	1619	Nephew of Pararacacekaran VIII; Grandson of Pararacacekaran VII; Son/grandson of Cekaracacekaran VIII

== Portuguese Empire (1619-1624) ==
Portrait	Name	Birth	Death	King From	King Until	Relationship with Predecessor(s)
	Don Constantine	-	-	1619	1624	

== See also ==
- Jaffna Kingdom
- History of Sri Lanka
