= Portuguese invasion of the Jaffna kingdom (1591) =

Part of the Portuguese conquest of the Jaffna kingdom

Portuguese invasion of Jaffna kingdom (1591)
- Part of Portuguese conquest of the Jaffna kingdom
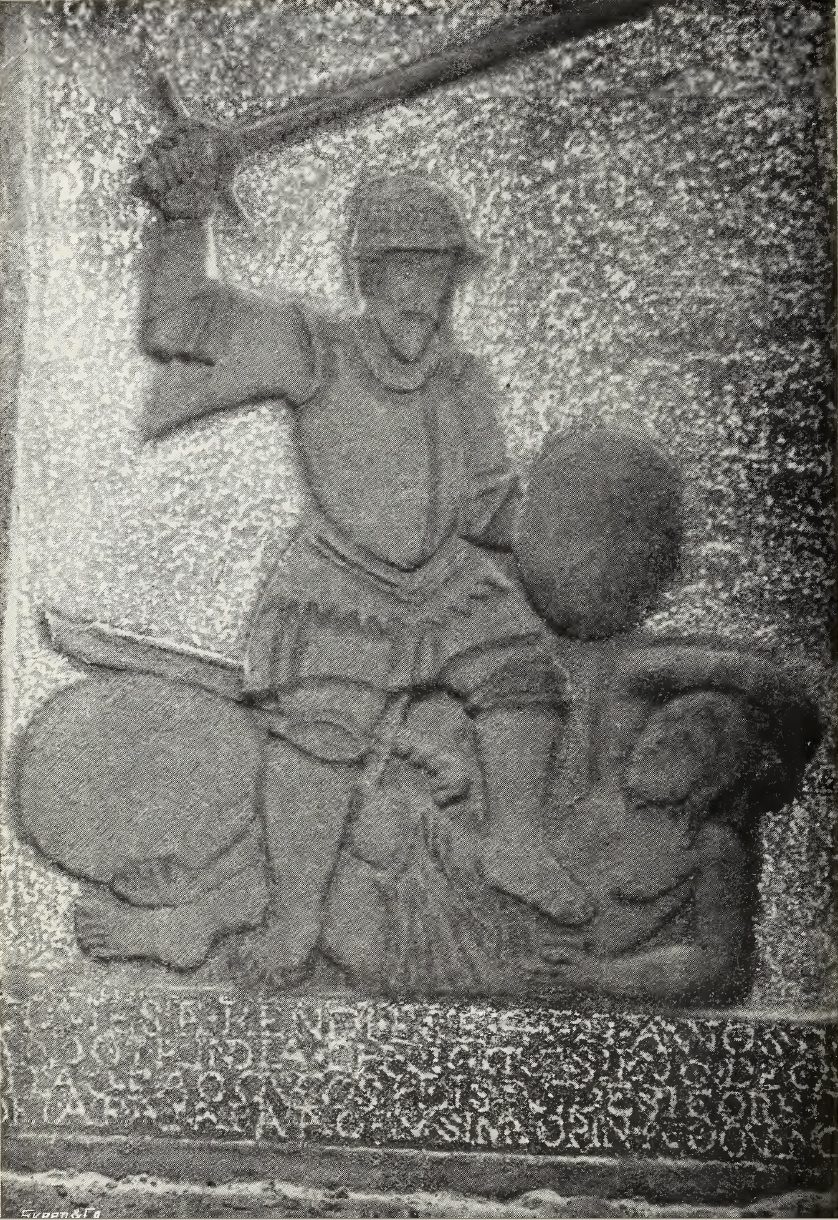
- Ethirimana Cinkam saved by a Portuguese captain, a mural from Maha Saman Devalaya
Date	1591
Location	Nallur, Jaffna
Result	Portuguese victory; Portuguese killed Puviraja Pandaram and set up Ethirimana Cinkam as a king.; Jaffna kingdom became tributary state

Belligerents
Portuguese Empire	Jaffna kingdom

Commanders and leaders
(Portuguese Empire) André Furtado de Mendonça	Puviraja Pandaram (executed); Prince Gago †; Ethirimana Cinkam (WIA)

Strength
4,400 soldiers (1,400 Portuguese, 3,000 Lascarins)	N/A

Casualties and losses
Few	Heavy ----Various weapons and ammunition captured

Portuguese invasion of Jaffna kingdom in 1591 AD was the second expedition against the Jaffna kingdom by the Portuguese. The campaign, led by Captain André Furtado de Mendonça, started from Mannar and continued to Nallur, the capital of the Jaffna kingdom. The Portuguese captured the kingdom, killed the king, and installed Ethirimana Cinkam as the new ruler.

== Background ==
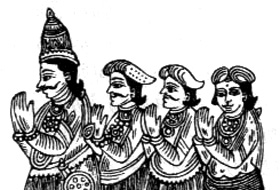
Puvirasa Pandaram (second from left)

The first expedition against the Jaffna kingdom was partially successful, but the Portuguese did not undertake any further military campaigns until the death of Cankili I. His death created competition for the crown amongst his offspring and opened up the opportunity for the Portuguese to intervene.

Due to the murder of the first son, (Note: Cankili's eldest son was known as Prince Martyr; he converted to Christianity and prepared for baptism, but was murdered in 1544.) Cankili's second son Puvirasa Pandaram became king; however, Kasi Nayinar Pararacacekaran forcibly took the kingdom from him. Puvirasa Pandaram then requested help from the Portuguese army, which was stationed in Mannar. The Portuguese captured Kasi Nayinar, imprisoned him, and installed a new ruler. Later, supporters of Kasi Nayinar rescued him, killed the new ruler, and Kasi Nayinar regained the kingdom. The Portuguese assassinated Kasi Nayinar and Periyapillai became the king with their support.

In 1582, Puvirasa Pandaram captured the kingdom and became unfriendly to Portuguese, even though he had previously requested assistance from them. He also continued anti-Portuguese activities, including an unsuccessful attack on Portuguese forces in Mannar in 1591. As a result, the Portuguese prepared to invade Jaffna.

== Battle ==
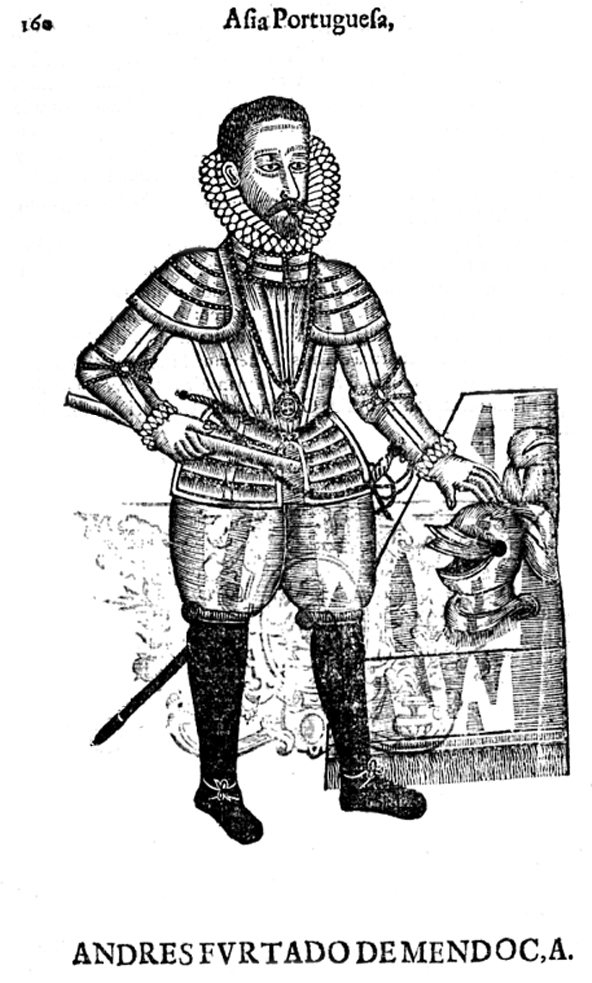
André Furtado de Mendonça

On 26 October 1591, the Portuguese, led by André Furtado, mounted a military campaign against the Jaffna kingdom from Mannar. The forces consisted of 1,400 Portuguese soldiers and 3,000 Lascarins, who sailed with 43 ships and more than 200 small vessels. Jaffna forces were expecting the arrival in Kayts, but the fleet landed in Colombuthurai. With the support of heavy firepower, the first wave of 150 Portuguese soldiers and 200 Lascarins reached land. The first-wave attack favoured the Portuguese, who managed to kill the enemy soldiers and captured two pieces of artillery, more than 300 muskets, various other weapons, and ammunition.

The second wave, comprising 400 Portuguese soldiers, reached land, followed by the rest of the soldiers, who captured a storehouse and stationed at night. The next day, the Portuguese forces marched toward the capital and faced a defensive attack led by Prince Gago, son-in-law of Puvirasa Pandaram. Gago was killed in action and his entire company was wiped out. Advancing forces faced another ferocious defensive attack between the Nallur Kandaswamy temple and the Nallur Weerakaliyamman temple. Prince Ethirimana Cinkam was wounded and was about to be executed by the invading forces, but was saved by a captain, Simão Pinhão.

The Portuguese army captured the king when he tried to escape into a temple. André Furtado ordered the king's execution by beheading. His head was then placed on a pike and kept on display for several days. The palace was sacked and the king's entire family was taken captive. Eight hundred Badagas and some Moors of Kozhikode were beheaded, as they were considered enemies. All the vessels in the port were burnt except two vessels for the use of the king. Three ships, 100 Portuguese soldiers, and 200 Lascarins were stationed in Jaffna at the request of the new king.
