= André Furtado de Mendonça =

Governor of Portuguese-occupied India (1558-1611 AD)

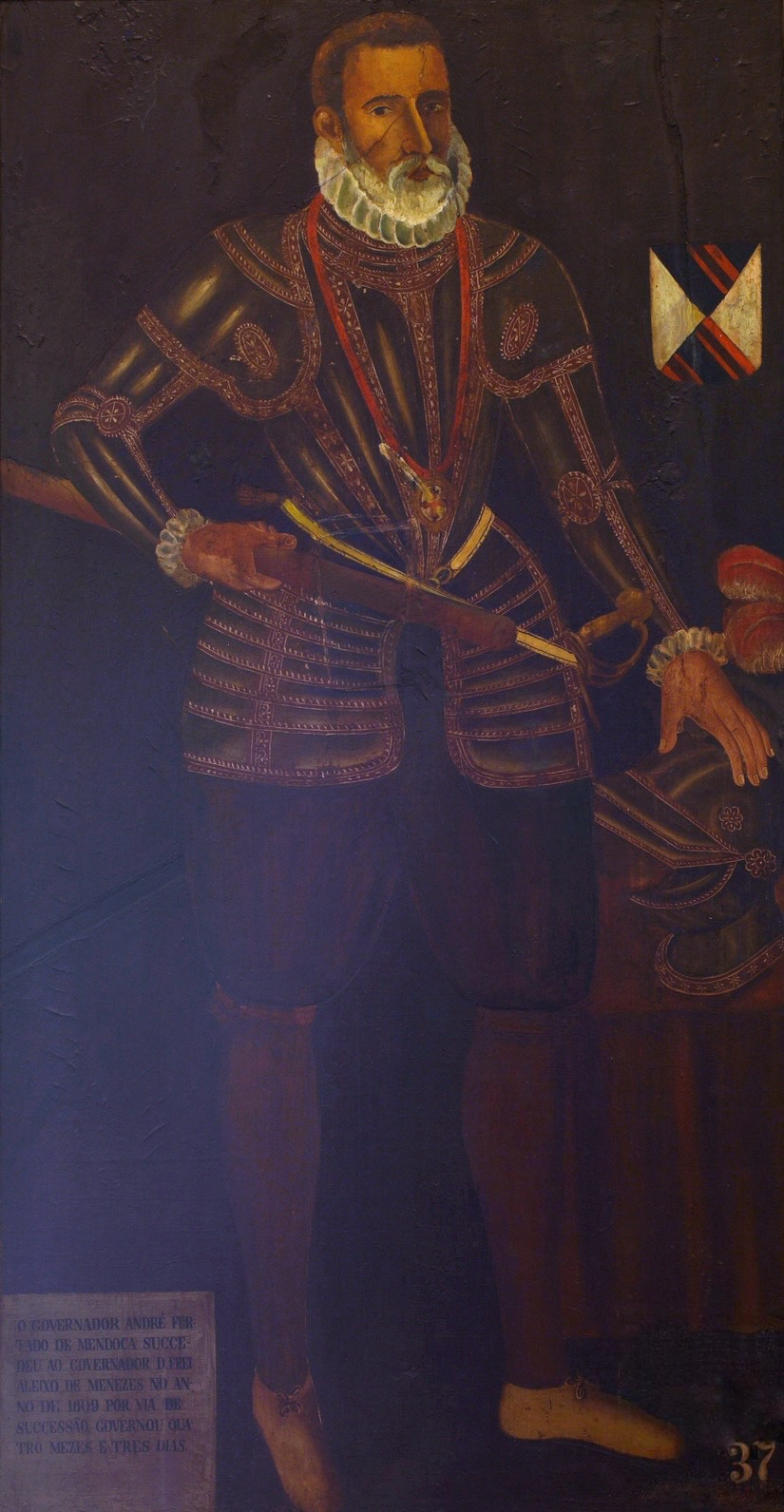

Governor of Portuguese India
- In office 1609 – 1609 or 1610
- Monarch: Philip II of Portugal
- Preceded by: Aleixo de Menezes
- Succeeded by: Rui Lourenço de Távora

Personal details
- Born: 1558 Lisbon, Kingdom of Portugal
- Died: 1611 (aged 52–53) Kingdom of Portugal

Military service
- Allegiance: Portuguese Empire
- Battles/wars: Portuguese invasion of the Jaffna kingdom (1591); Siege of Kottakkal; Ternate expedition (1603); Siege of Malacca (1606); Battle of Bantam; Battle of Flores

André Furtado de Mendonça (1558 – 1 April 1611) was a captain and governor of Portuguese India, and a military commander during Portuguese expansion into Ceylon, India, Indonesia and Malacca.

== Biography ==
He was a son of Afonso Furtado Mendoça, commander of Beja and Rio Maior and D. Joana Sousa. André Furtado was curious to develop combat knowledge and he started to study combat, meteorology and oceanography and cartography when he was 18 years old. He joined the military and became a successful captain at the age of 25. He served some of the Portuguese colonial countries in the Indian Ocean for the Portuguese Empire.

== Portuguese Ceylon ==
André Furtado de Mendonça led the forces of a company of 1,400 Portuguese and 3,000 lascarins against King Puviraja Pandaram as the second expedition in Mannar and gained victory, and continued his campaign to the heartland of the Jaffna kingdom. Captain André Furtado killed king Puvirasa Pandaram in 1591. After the death of Puvirasa Pandaram, his son Ethirimana Cinkam was installed as the ruler by André Furtado. It created Portuguese overlordship in the region including freedom to Catholic Christian missions. Earlier, Christian missionaries were not allowed during the rule of Puvirasa Pandaram. Gradually, the incumbent king resisted Portuguese overlordship until he was ousted and hanged by Filipe de Oliveira in 1619.

== Portuguese India ==
In 1598, he destroyed a fleet of Kunjali Marakkar naval captain of Zamorin of Calicut, and in 1600 Mendonça attacked and captured his fortress.

== Portuguese Ambon and the Moluccas ==
Between 1601 and 1603, Furtado de Mendonça served as captain-general of the Southern Sea, and succeeded in expelling the Dutch from Ambon and Tidore, where the Portuguese held fortresses, and secured Portuguese holdings in the region against hostile native lords.

== Portuguese Malacca ==
In April 1606, Portuguese forces under the captainship of André Furtado were besieged in Malacca by a Dutch fleet under the command of Cornelis Matelief de Jonge. Portuguese forces were no match to Dutch due to disproportional size of men and vessels. However, they managed to resist the besiegers until August 1606 and received support from Viceroy Martim Afonso de Castro.

== Portuguese India ==
André Furtado engaged with several battles in India, including fierce battle with Kunhali Marakkar. His forces bombarded Marakkar fort from the sea while allies Samoodiri attacked it from the land in 1600. Kunjali Marakkar surrendered to Samoothiri as he lost the battle. Finally, the Portuguese seized the Kunjali, against the terms of the surrender, during a tumult caused by an enemy attack. Then Furtado ordered the fort and the town razed, the Kunjali executed, quartered, and his body displayed on a pike.

After the death of viceroy D. João Pereira Forjaz in 1609, André Furtado became the governor of Portuguese India for only three months until the arrival of new viceroy Rui Lourenço Tavora.

== Death ==
He died due to illness in April 1611 and buried at the church of Covenant of Grace (Portuguese: Convento da Graça) in Lisbon.

== See also ==
- Madre de Deus
- Battle of Cape Rachado

Government offices
Preceded by Aleixo de Menezes	Governor of Portuguese India; 1609	Succeeded by Rui Lourenço de Távora
