= Sankili =

thumb Sankili may refer to:

- Cankili I
- LOKESH Sankili, Srikakulam
