= 1560 Portuguese invasion of Jaffna =

Part of the Portuguese conquest of the Jaffna kingdom

Portuguese invasion of Jaffna kingdom (1560)
- Part of Portuguese conquest of the Jaffna kingdom
Date	1560
Location	Nallur, Jaffna
Result	Portuguese victory; Portuguese captured the capital; Pact between Portuguese and Jaffna kingdom; Portuguese failed to subdue Jaffna, but Mannar Island and surrounding controlled by the Portuguese

Belligerents
Portuguese Empire	Jaffna kingdom

Commanders and leaders
Dom Constantino de Bragança	Cankili I

Strength
1,200 soldiers	2,000 soldiers (first attack); Unknown (Defending capital)

Casualties and losses
Few	Heavy

The Portuguese invasion of Jaffna kingdom in 1560 AD was the first expedition against the Jaffna kingdom by the Portuguese Empire. It was led by Viceroy Dom Constantino de Bragança and resulted in the capture of the capital, Nallur. The king of Jaffna, Cankili I, managed to escape and regained the capital through a pact that he made with the Portuguese. He subsequently incited a peoples' rebellion against the Portuguese, resulting in their withdrawing their forces from Nallur. The Jaffna kingdom, however, lost its sovereignty over Mannar Island and its main town, Mannar.

== Background ==
The massacre of about 600 to 700 Christians in Mannar in 1544 by Cankili I enraged Catholic priests, who complained to the Portuguese authorities in Goa. The Portuguese did not carry out any reprisals, however, as they were facing hostilities in India. The complaint eventually reached the King João III, who ordered his forces at Goa to punish the King of Jaffna for his actions. There was a delay in carrying out the order.

When Dom Constantino left Portugal in 1558, Queen Catherine instructed him to execute the king's order, which had been delayed for various reasons. She ordered that the king of Jaffna should be punished especially for the Mannar massacre and the continuing persecution of Christians.

== Battle ==
Dom Constantino sailed in September 1560 from Goa to Jaffna with 20 galleys, 10 galiots, and 70 ships. The forces consisted of 1,200 soldiers; that small number of troops was unfit to carry out the planned invasion.

The forces reached the shore of Colombuthurai, where they were met by the Jaffna forces of 2,000 soldiers led by a prince. The heavy artillery barrage from the Portuguese ships inflicted significant casualties on the Jaffna forces, and as a result, the Portuguese forces were able to reach land and advance on the capital. The capital was located on an open plain and fortified by stones and sands, with some strong bastions provided with artillery and much infantry.

The capital fell to the Portuguese and the king withdrew his forces to a small fort in Kopay. Before the next day's dawn, the palace was set afire and the king escaped to the Vanni region. A group of Portuguese soldiers followed in an attempt to capture him, but were unsuccessful.

== Pact ==
Acknowledging that he was not in a position to repel the enemy forces, the king sent Dom Constantino to sue for peace. The viceroy seized the opportunity, as he had limited troops and was short of food and ammunition. The provisions of the pact signed between the warring parties were as follows:

- The king and his son were allowed to continue to rule the kingdom
- Control of Mannar Island and the western shore would be ceded to the Portuguese
- Jaffna forces were not permitted firearms and other explosive weapons
- Jaffna was not allowed to employ foreign forces
- Portuguese forces were permitted to remain in Jaffna
- The hidden treasury of the father of the Kotte king was to be handed over to the Portuguese
- Every year a certain number of elephants would be provided to the Portuguese as a tribute
- Catholic missionary work was not allowed to be disrupted
- A prince and two Mudaliyars would be retained by the Portuguese to secure the provisions of the pact

== See also ==
- Portuguese invasion of Jaffna kingdom (1591)
