= Ternate expedition (1603) =

1603 military expedition

- Part of Ternatean–Portuguese conflicts
Date	14 February – 23 March 1603
Location	Ternate, Moluccas
Result	Ternatean–Dutch victory

Belligerents
Spanish Empire; Portuguese Empire	Sultanate of Ternate; Dutch East India

Commanders and leaders
Juan Juárez de Gallinato; André Furtado de Mendonça	Saidi Berkat

Strength
200 Spanish; 420 Portuguese	Unknown

In 1603, a military expedition was launched by a joint of Spanish-Portuguese forces to capture the city of Ternate. The expedition failed to achieve its objectives.

== Background ==
At the beginning of the 17th century, the Dutch and the English became a menace to the colonial empires of Spain and Portugal. The Iberians, who were catholic, teamed up against their Protestant enemies. In January 1603, the Portuguese captain, André Furtado de Mendonça, requested the Spanish governor of the Philippines, Pedro Bravo de Acuña, to assist him in capturing the Malukus from the Ternateans with men and supplies as the Portuguese lacked both. The Ternatean Sultan, Saidi Berkat, asked for help from the Javanese and the Mindanoas, and the Dutch assisted him in fortifying his capital. On January 20, a squadron of 200 Spanish and 5 ships under Juan Xuarez Gallinato (who had returned from his failed expedition in Jolo), was well supplied and arrived on Tidore on February 14. The Portuguese under Furtado joined the Spanish with 420 men in Ternate.

== Expedition ==
The Spanish and the Portuguese began a blockade on the island and cut off the supplies. Many residents were forced to seek refuge in the Spanish. Furtado had waited long enough and wanted to attack now. Despite Gallinato's protest, the troops disembarked with artillery. The troops landed on the narrow beach where the Ternateans built a fortification. The Ternateans stubbornly defended the fort and finally gave up to allow the Spanish and Portuguese to approach Ternate city. The Iberians erected their batteries and bombarded the city; however, it was ineffective. The Ternateans were well supplied with weapons and safe behind their walls, resisting the Iberians fiercely with their Dutch allies. The Ternateans even launched a sortie during which brave fighting between both sides but the Ternateans retreated. Furtado began losing heart, the help that Sultan of Tidor promised did not arrive, his native allies retreated or defected, reports of upcoming Dutch ships could come at any time, and the Iberians were exhausted forcing Furtado to give up on the siege. Gallinato refused, but the Portuguese officers agreed with Furtado and decided to retreat. On March 23, Furtado returned to Malacca while Gallinato returned to Manilla.

== Sources ==
- Gregorio F Zaide (1957), Philippine political and cultural history.
- Pieter Anton Tiele (1877), De Europeërs in den maleischen archipel.
- Ernest Mason Satow (2017), The Voyage of Captain John Saris to Japan, 1613.
- Jan Jacob Mauricius (1732), Historische versaamelingen over de vaart der Spanjaarden na de Philippines.
