= Banten Bay =

Bay in Banten province near the northwest tip of Java, Indonesia

Coordinates: 6°0′0″S 106°12′0″E

Banten Bay, also known as Bantam Bay, is a bay in Banten province, near the northwest tip of Java, Indonesia. It is part of the Java Sea and has a total water surface of approximately 150 square kilometres (58 sq mi; 44 sq nmi) and an average depth of 7 metres (23 ft). It includes marine ecosystems such as seagrass fields and coral reefs, and a major international bird sanctuary. The coastal zone, including the nearby cities of Serang and the port of Merak, is undergoing rapid industrialisation.

The bay has been the site of two major naval battles:

- Battle of Bantam, 1601, during the Dutch-Portuguese War
- Battle of Sunda Strait, 1942, during World War II
