= Akkarayan =

Akkarayan (Tamil: அக்கராயன்) was one of the Tamil chiefs of Vanni Nadu, who ruled over Akkarayan region around 13th century. He was credited for building the Akkarayan Kulam in Kilinochchi. 2018, was a statue of king Akkarayan opened in Kilinochchi.

== See also ==
- Vanniar (Chieftain)
- List of Tamil monarchs
