= Don Constantine =

Dom Constantino
- King of Jaffna
- Reign: 1619 - 1624
- Predecessor: Cankili II
- Successor: Monarchy ended Filipe de Oliveira as Captain-major

Dom Constantino was the child last titular King of Jaffna in the 17th century, whose reign lasted from 1619 to 1624. He succeeded Cankili II. He and his domain were under de facto Portuguese control. With the conquest of the Jaffna kingdom and the end of the monarch Dom Constantino was succeeded by Filipe de Oliveira, as Captain-major.

== See also ==
- List of Jaffna monarchs
- Jaffna kingdom

Don Constantine Portuguese puppet Born: ? ? Died: ? ?
Regnal titles
Preceded by Cankili II	King of Jaffna; 1619–1624	Succeeded by Monarchy ended Filipe de Oliveira as Captain-major
