= Battle of Bantam =

1601 naval battle of the Dutch-Portuguese War

- Part of Dutch–Portuguese War
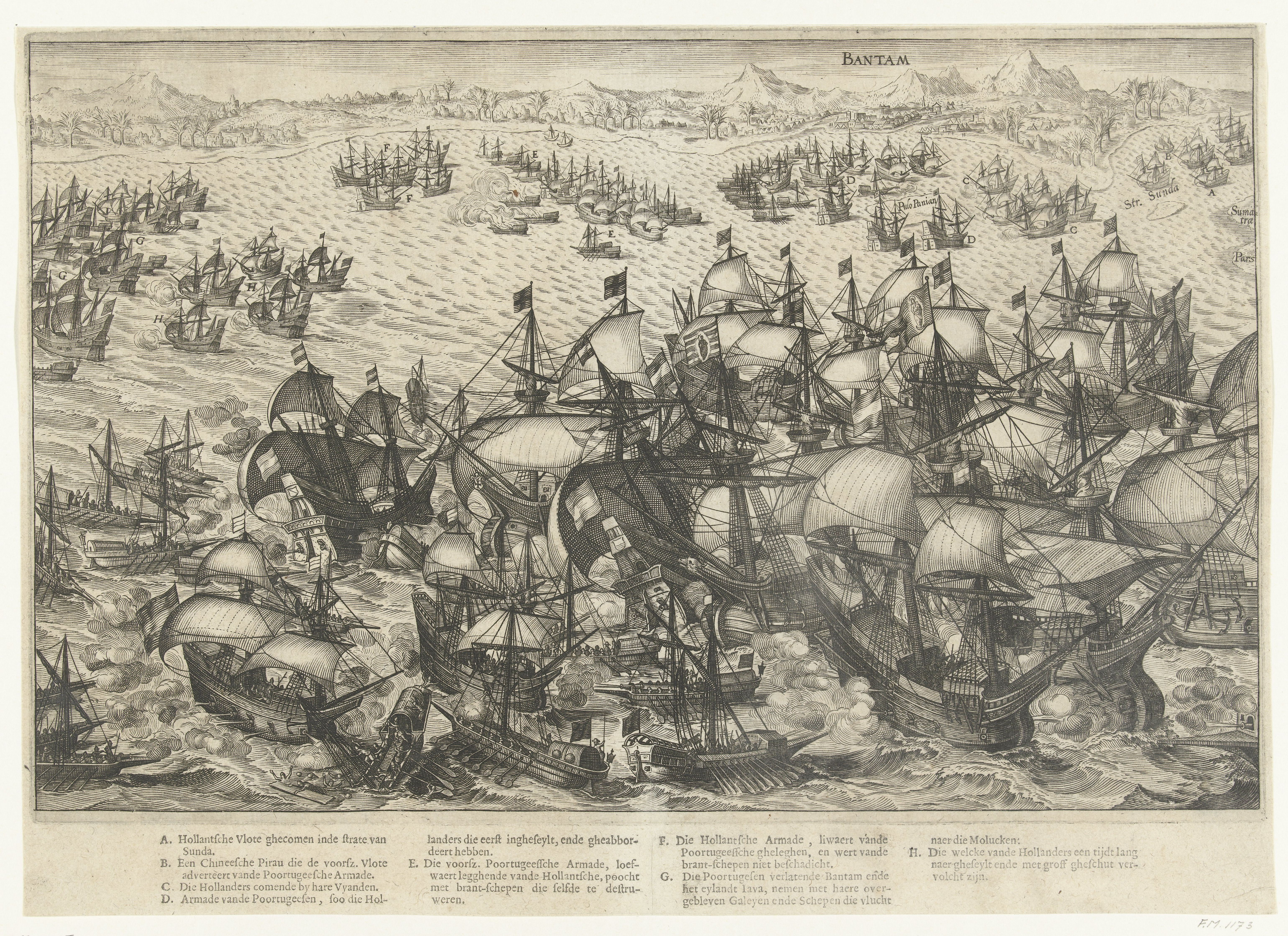
- Victory of the Dutch over the Portuguese fleet in Banten, 1601.
Date	27 December 1601
Location	Banten Bay, Indonesia
Result	Dutch victory

Belligerents
Dutch Republic	Portugal

Commanders and leaders
Wolfert Harmensz	André Furtado de Mendonça

Strength
5 ships	8 galleons several fustas

Casualties and losses
None	3 fustas captured

The naval Battle of Bantam took place on 27 December 1601 in Bantam Bay (now Banten Bay), Indonesia, when an exploration fleet of five Dutch ships under the command of Wolfert Harmensz and a Portuguese fleet under André Furtado de Mendonça, sent from Goa to restore Portuguese authority, met in the Indonesian archipelago. The battle resulted in Dutch victory and forced the Portuguese to retreat. The outnumbered Dutch fleet took three Portuguese fustas as prizes.

== Ships involved ==
- Netherlands
  - Gelderland (Wolfert Harmensz)
  - Zeelandia (Jan Cornelisz)
  - Utrecht (Jan Martensz)
  - Wachter (yacht) (Gerrit Hendricksz Roobol)
  - Duyfken (yacht) (Willem Schouten)
- Portugal (André Furtado de Mendonça), 30 vessels total
  - 8 galleons
  - Several fustas—3 set alight and captured by Dutch
