= Constantino of Braganza =

Portuguese statesman and conquistador (1528–1575)

Constantino de Bragança
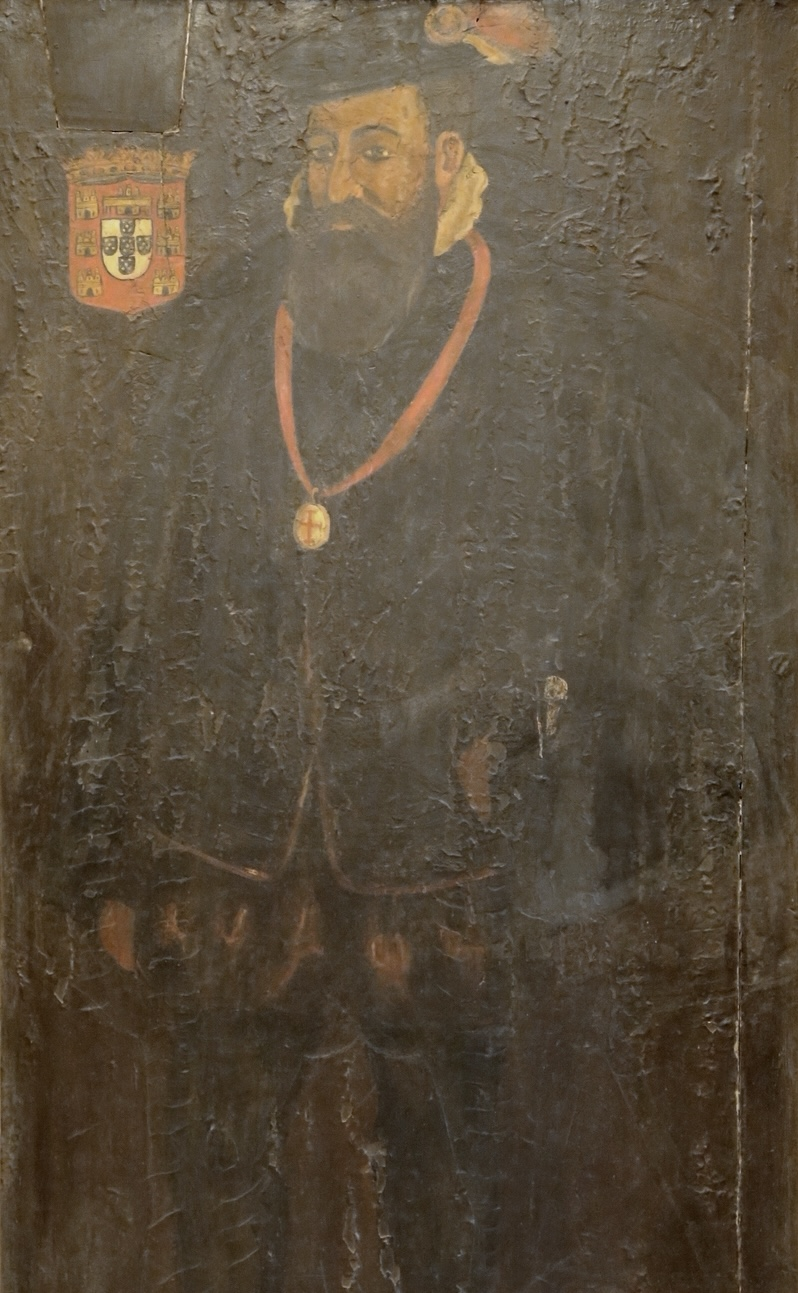

Viceroy of India
- In office 1558–1561
- Monarch: Sebastian
- Preceded by: Francisco Barreto
- Succeeded by: Francisco Coutinho

Captain-major of Ribeira Grande
- In office 1562–1570?
- Monarch: Sebastian
- Preceded by: Manuel de Andrade
- Succeeded by: Office abolished

Personal details
- Born: 1528 Kingdom of Portugal
- Died: 15 July 1575 (aged 46–47) Kingdom of Portugal
- Spouse: Maria de Melo

D. Constantino of Braganza (Portuguese: Constantino de Bragança; 1528–1575) was a Portuguese nobleman, conquistador, and administrator of the Portuguese Empire. Born a member of the powerful House of Braganza, he is best known for having served as Viceroy of India and for initiating the Portuguese conquest of Sri Lanka.

== Biography ==
He was the son of Dom James, 4th Duke of Braganza from his second marriage to Joana of Mendoça, daughter of Diogo of Mendonça, High-Alcaide of Mourão.

When he was 19 years old, he was appointed by King Dom John III of Portugal as his special ambassador to the baptism ceremony of King Henry II of France's son.

In 1558, he was appointed by the regent Dona Catherine of Habsburg (King Dom John III's widow) as the 20th Governor of Portuguese India, using also the title of 7th Viceroy. He left Lisbon on 7 April 1558 and arrived in Goa on 3 September.

He was a remarkable organiser of the local State, and he conquered Daman, Ceylon (nowadays known as Sri Lanka) and the island of Manar.

A first expedition, led by Viceroy Dom Constantino de Bragança in 1560, failed to subdue Jaffna, but captured Mannar Island. By June 1619, despite sharp resistance from Cankili II of Jaffna, there were two Portuguese expeditions; a naval expedition that was repulsed by the Malabari corsairs and another expedition by Dom Filipe de Oliveira and his land army of 5,000, which defeated Cankili and conquered Jaffna, strengthening Portuguese control of shipping routes through the Palk Strait.

His government in India took three years and eight days, and during that period he made important reforms. He was considered by the historian C. R. Boxer one of the most fanatic Portuguese governors of India together with Dom Francisco Barreto (1555–1558).

He protected the poet Luis Vaz de Camões, during his stay in India.

He was later governor of Ribeira Grande, in the island of Santo Antão, Portuguese Cape Verde, from 1562.

Dom Constantino afterwards returned to the Kingdom. There he married his cousin, D. Maria de Melo, daughter of the 1st Marquess of Ferreira and 1st Count of Tentúgal, D. Rodrigo de Melo, and Dona Brites de Menezes (daughter of Dom Antão de Almada, 3rd Count of Avranches). The couple had no issue. King Sebastian of Portugal thought, in 1571, to appoint him as perpetual viceroy of India, but he refused.

== Tooth relic ==
According to Mutu Coomara Swamy, Constantino claimed to play a part in capturing and destroying the Tooth-Relic of Gotama Buddha, during the wars of the Portuguese. The native authorities however, maintained the relic was kept safe from harm.

== Ancestry ==
Ancestors of Constantino of Braganza

8. Fernando I, Duke of Braganza
4. Fernando II, Duke of Braganza
9. Joana de Castro, 3rd Lady of Cadaval
2. Jaime, Duke of Braganza
10. Fernando, Duke of Viseu
5. Isabel of Viseu
11. Beatriz of Portugal
1. Costantino of Braganza
12. Afonso Furtado de Mendonça
6. Diogo de Mendoça, Alcaide-Mor of Mourão
13. Beatriz de Vilaragut
3. Joana de Mendoça
14. Fernão Soares de Albergaria, Lord of Prado
7. Brites Soares de Albergaria
15. Maria Gonçalves Alcafachoa

== See also ==
- House of Braganza
- Duke of Braganza
- Portuguese India
- List of colonial heads of Portuguese India
- Relics associated with Buddha § Relics in Sri Lanka
- Relic of the tooth of the Buddha
- Gaspar Jorge de Leão Pereira

Preceded by Francisco Barreto	7th Viceroy of Portuguese India (1558–1561)	Succeeded by Francisco Coutinho, count of Redondo
Preceded by Manuel de Andrade	Colonial heads of Ribeira Grande, Portuguese Cape Verde (1562 - early 1570s)	Succeeded by eliminated
