= Siege of Malacca (1606) =

Portugal repels Dutch and Johor forces

- Part of the Dutch–Portuguese War and Malay–Portuguese conflicts
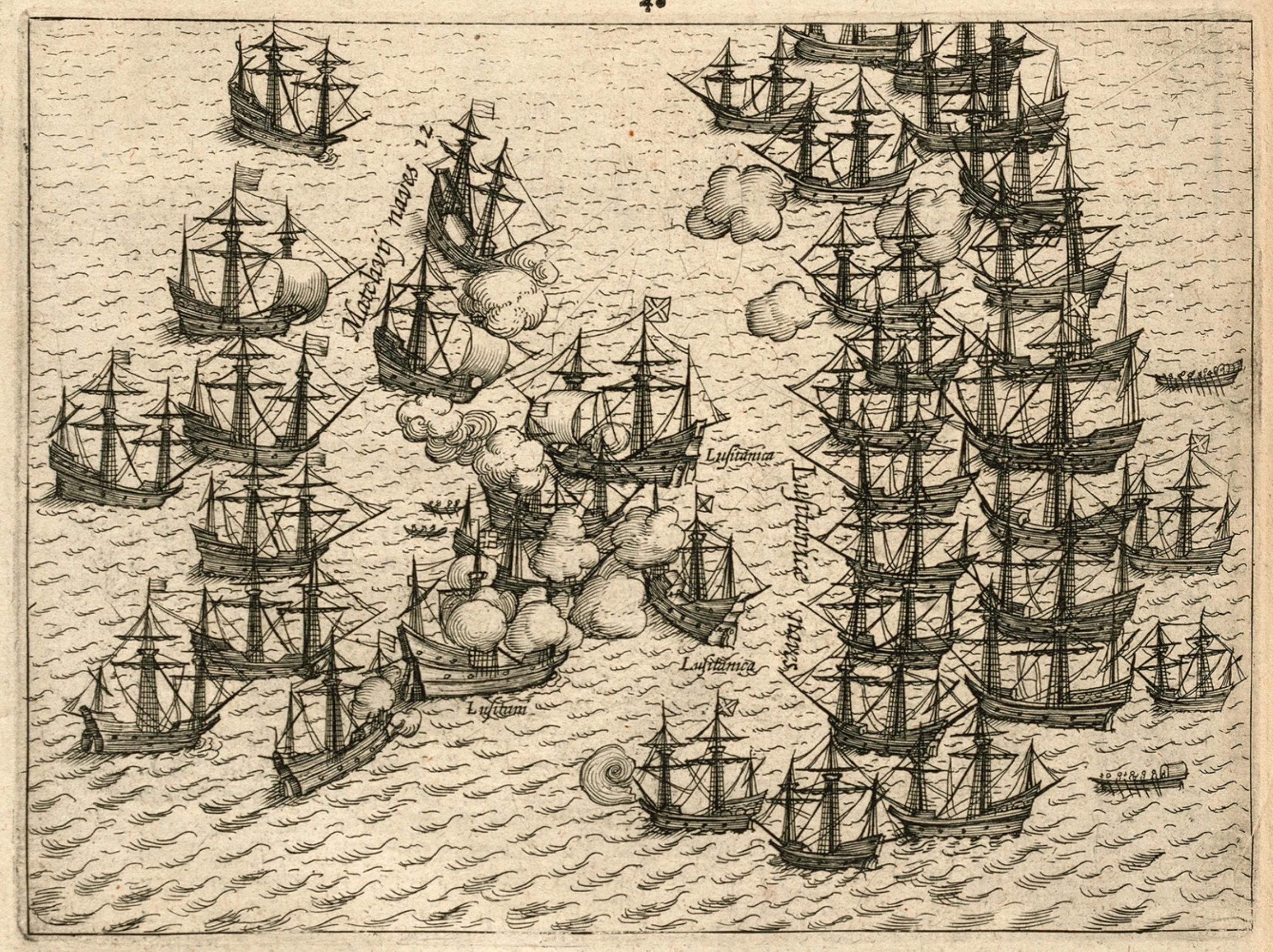
- Battle for Malacca between the VOC fleet and the Portuguese, 1606.
Date	1606
Location	Portuguese Malacca
Result	Portuguese victory

Belligerents
Portugal	Dutch Republic; Johor Sultanate

Commanders and leaders
André Furtado de Mendonça; Martim Afonso de Castro	Cornelis Matelief de Jonge; Alauddin Riayat Shah III

Strength
180 men; 20 ships	14,000 men; 12 ships

Casualties and losses
Unknown	Unknown

The siege of Malacca of 1606 was a military engagement between a Dutch force commanded by Cornelis Matelief and the Portuguese commander André Furtado de Mendonça.

The small Portuguese garrison managed to hold out and stop any Dutch direct attacks on the city until additional reinforcements led by Martim Afonso de Castro arrived, which caused the Dutch to retreat from the siege. After they retreated, they were again defeated by the Portuguese at the Battle of Cape Rachado.
