= Martim Afonso de Castro =

Portuguese colonial administrator

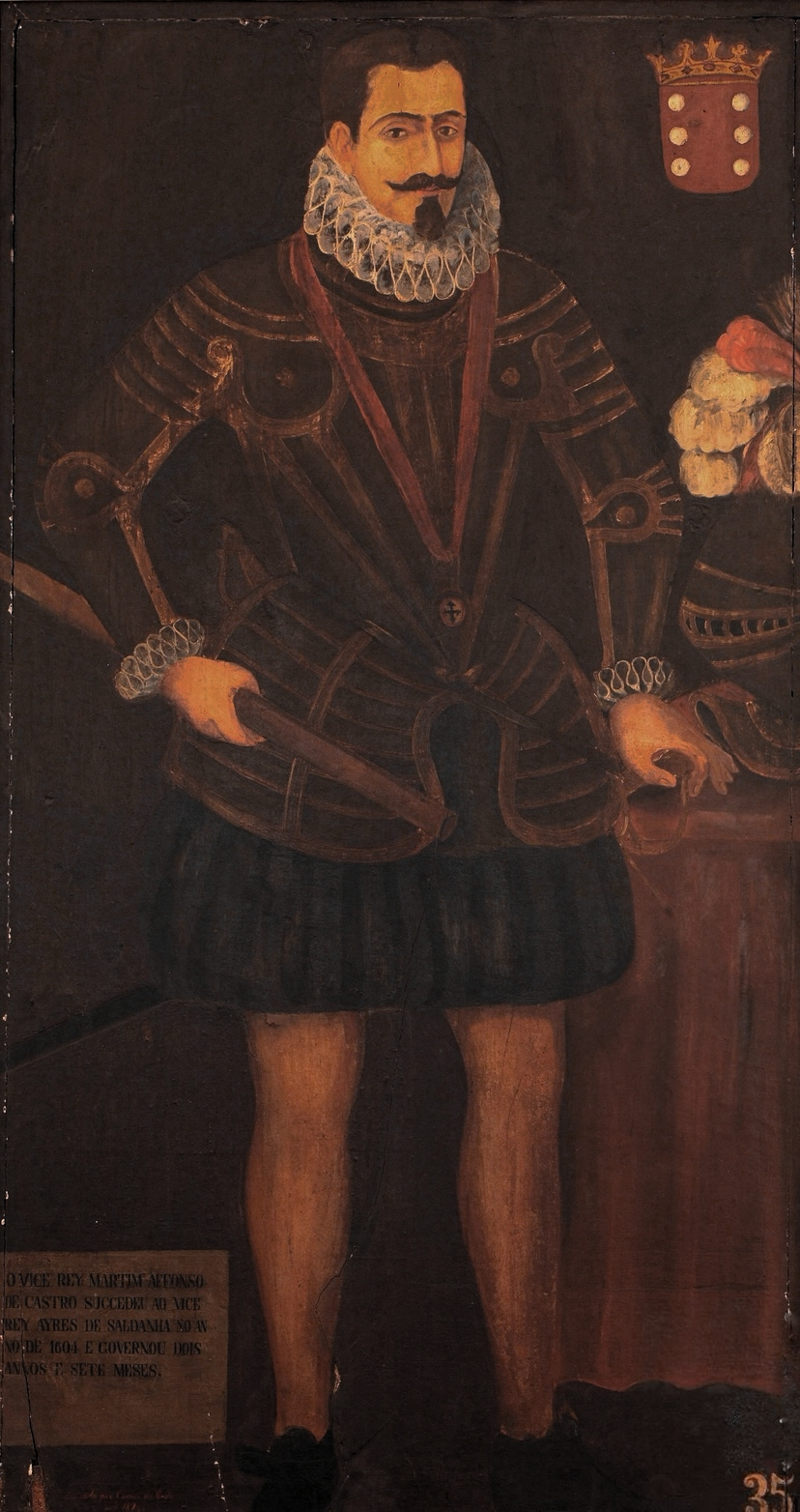

Viceroy of Portuguese India
- In office 1605–1607
- Monarch: Philip II of Portugal
- Preceded by: Aires de Saldanha
- Succeeded by: Aleixo de Meneses

Personal details
- Born: c. 1560 Kingdom of Portugal
- Died: 3 June 1607 (aged 46–47) Portuguese Malacca

Military service
- Allegiance: Portuguese Empire
- Battles/wars: Aceh expedition (1606); Dutch-Portuguese War: Siege of Malacca; Battle of Cape Rachado

Martim Afonso de Castro (died 3 June 1607 in Malacca) was a Portuguese Viceroy of India. He commanded the Portuguese Navy in the Battle of Cape Rachado and fought over the present day Malaccan exclave of Tanjung Tuan in 1606.
