= Battle of Cape Rachado =

1606 naval engagement between Dutch and Portuguese fleets

- Part of the Dutch–Portuguese War
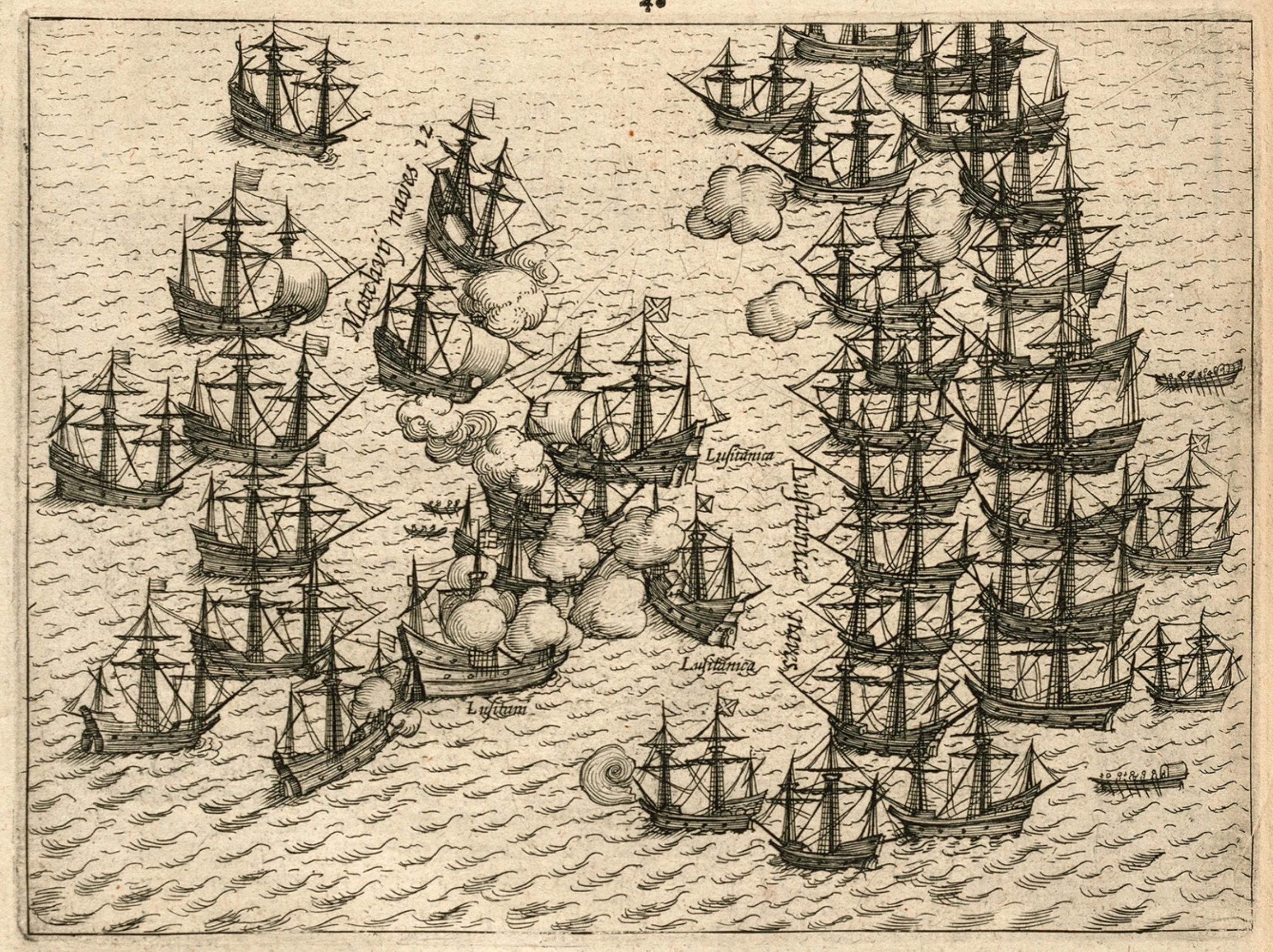
| Date | 16–18 August 1606 |
| Location | Off Cape Rachado, Portuguese Malacca |
| Result | Portuguese victory |

Belligerents
| Portuguese Empire | Dutch Republic; Dutch East India Company |

Commanders and leaders
| Martim de Castro | Cornelis de Jonge |

Strength
| 20 ships | 11 ships |

Casualties and losses
| 2 ships lost 500 dead | 2 ships lost 150 dead |

The Battle of Cape Rachado, off Cape Rachado in 1606, was an important naval engagement between the Dutch East India Company (VOC) and Portuguese Navy.

It marked the beginning of a conflict between the combined Dutch-Johor forces against the Portuguese. It was the biggest naval battle in the Malay Archipelago between two naval superpowers of the time with 31 ships (11 VOC ships and 20 Portuguese). Although the battle ended with a Portuguese victory, the ferocity of the battle itself and the losses sustained by the victor convinced the Sultanate of Johor to provide supplies, support, and later on much needed ground forces to the Dutch, forcing a Portuguese capitulation. 130 years of Portuguese supremacy in the region ended with the fall of the city and fortress of Malacca, almost 30 years later, in 1641.

== Departure and alliance with Johor ==
Malacca, which was earlier the capital of the Sultanate of Malacca, was besieged and captured by the Portuguese in 1511, forcing the Sultan of Malacca Mahmud Shah to retreat. Mahmud Shah's son Alauddin Riayat Shah II later founded the Sultanate of Johor and continued to war against the Portuguese from there. The port city, which the Portuguese had turned into a formidable fortress, was strategically situated in the middle of the Strait of Malacca giving control to both the spice trade of the Malay Archipelago and supremacy over the sea lane of the lucrative trade between Europe and the Far East. The Dutch East India Company (VOC) decided that to expand further to the east, the Portuguese monopoly and especially Malacca must first be neutralised.

The fleet was the third sent by the VOC to the archipelago, with 11 ships – Oranje, Nassau, Middelburg, Witte Leeuw, Zwarte Leeuw, Mauritius, Grote Zon, Amsterdam, Kleine Zon, Erasmus, and Geuniveerde Provincien. The Oranje with Admiral Cornelis Matelief de Jonge in command. The Dutch fleet set sail from Texel, Holland on 12 May 1605. The fleet departed with the sailors told that they were on a trade voyage as de Jonge was ordered to keep his true mission a secret, which was to besiege Malacca and force a Portuguese surrender.

They passed Malacca in April 1606 and arrived at Johor on 1 May 1606 where de Jonge proceeded to negotiate for a term of alliance with Johor. The pact was formally concluded on 17 May 1606 in which Johor had agreed to a combined effort with the Dutch to attempt to dislodge the Portuguese from Malacca. Unlike the Portuguese, the Dutch and Johor agreed to respect each other's religion, the Dutch would get to keep Malacca and the right to trade in Johor. The Dutch also would not attempt to interfere or wage war against Johor. In effect, the agreement served to limit Dutch influence on the Malay Peninsula in contrast to the islands of the archipelago which would become the Dutch East Indies.

=== Dutch fleet ===
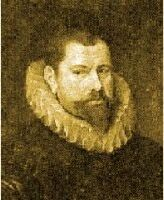
Cornelius Matelief de Jonge

| Name | Notes |
|---|---|
| Oranje | 700 tons, ship of Admiral Cornelis Matelief de Jonge, captained by Dirk Mol |
| Nassau | 320 tons, captained by Wouter Jacobz, sunk 18 August |
| Middelburg | 600 tons, captained by Simon Lambers, sunk 18 August |
| Witte Leeuw | 540 tons, captained by Claas Jansz |
| Zwarte Leeuw | 600 tons, captained by Abraham Mathijsz |
| Mauritius | 700 tons, captained by Gerrit Klaasz |
| Groote Zon | 540 tons, captained by Gerard Hendriksz |
| Amsterdam | 700 tons, ship of vice admiral Olivier de Vivere, captained by Reynier Lamberts |
| Kleine Zon | 220 tons, captained by Cornelis Jorisz |
| Erasmus | 500 tons, captained by Osier Cornelisz |
| Geuniveerde Provincien | 400 tons, captained by Antoine Antoniscz |

=== Portuguese fleet ===
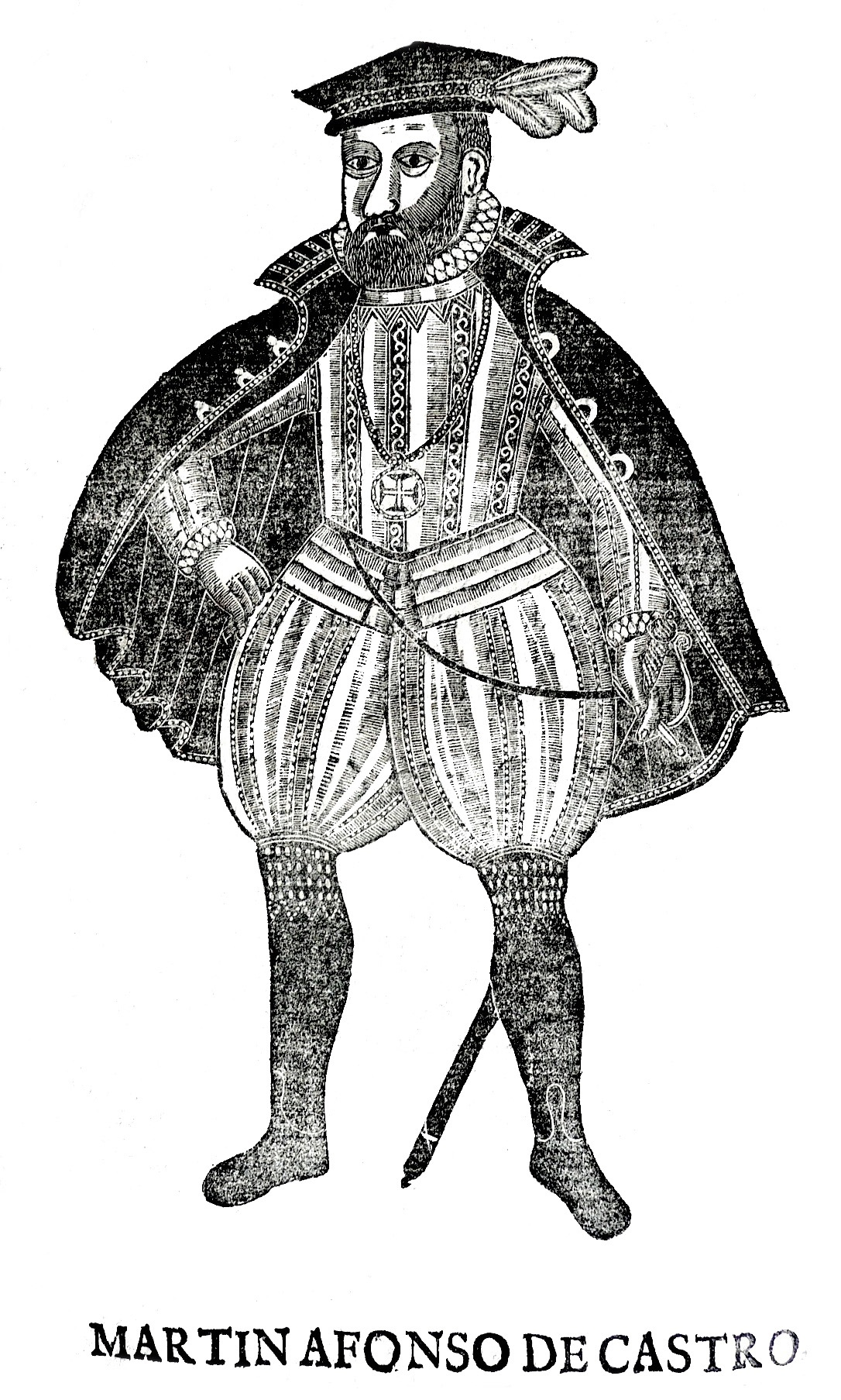
Portuguese Viceroy Martim Afonso de Castro

| Name | Notes |
|---|---|
| Nossa Senhora da Conceição | 1,000 tons, ship of Martim Afonso de Castro, captained by Manuel de Mascarenhas, burnt 31 October |
| São Simeão | 900 tons, captained by Dom Francisco de Soto-mayor, burnt 25 October |
| São Salvador | 900 tons, captained by Álvaro de Carvalho, sunk 18 August |
| Nossa Senhora das Mercês | 900 tons, captained by Dom Henrique de Noronha |
| Todos os Santos | 800 tons, captained by Dom Francisco de Noronha, burnt 22 October |
| São Nicolau | 800 tons, captained by Dom Fernando de Mascarenhas, burnt 22 October |
| Santa Cruz | 600 tons, captained by Sebastião Soares, burnt 22 October |
| Dom Duarte de Guerra's galleon | 600 tons, captained by Dom Duarte de Guerra, sunk 18 August |
| António | 240 tons, captained by António Sousa Falcão, burnt 29 October |

== Battle ==
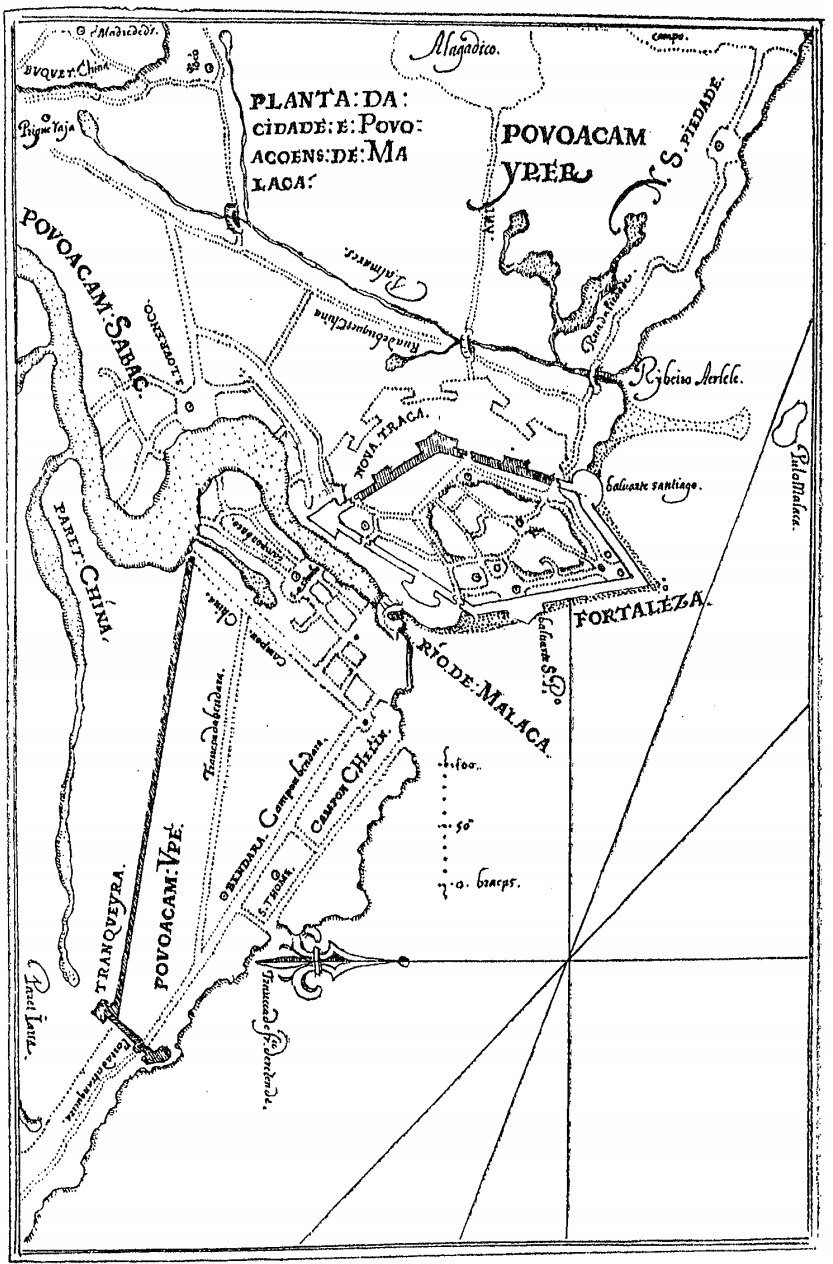
Portuguese Malacca and its surroundings in 1606

Matelief de Jonge started the assault by besieging the fortress and city of Malacca. He was hoping that by blockading and cutting the supplies to the Portuguese, prolonged hunger and direct assault would force them to capitulate. However, this was not so, as their Johor allies were still unsure of the ability of the Dutch forces against Malacca and did not fully commit their resources to the attack, other than limited supplies and safe haven at their ports. The Dutch, with few soldiers, could not afford a land offensive against their well-entrenched opponent.

The Dutch maintained the siege for a time and the situation started to get worse for the Portuguese until 14 August 1606 when a Portuguese fleet from Goa arrived. Led by the Viceroy of Goa, Dom Martim Afonso de Castro, the siege was lifted when the 20-odd ships began to engage the VOC fleet off the Malaccan coast. The two fleets exchanged cannon fire and the Portuguese ships began to move northward, drawing the Dutch away from Malacca. On 16 August 1606 a battle between the two fleets took place off the Portuguese controlled Cape Rachado.

Heavy cannon salvoes opened the battle with each side trying to weaken the opponent before the ships closed on each other and the battle would have to be fought hand-to-hand. On the morning of 18 August, after a couple of days of cannon duels, with the wind in favour of the Portuguese, Martim Afonso de Castro ordered the Portuguese to sail for the grapple. Matelief, seeing the danger, ordered his ships to turn sail away from the oncoming ships to evade boarding. The VOC ship Nassau failed to turn quickly, and ended up lingering behind, dangerously isolated. The Portuguese ship Santa Cruz caught up and boarded the Nassau.

Matelief de Jonge ordered his own ship, the Oranje, to quickly turn around to rescue the Nassau, but the manoeuvre sent the Oranje into a collision with the Middelburg. While the Dutch captains were busy freeing their ships, Martim de Castro's ship, the Nossa Senhora da Conceicão, boarded the Nassau from the other side. The Dutch crew of the Nassau managed to jump into a lifeboat, leaving the fiercely burning Nassau behind.

In the meantime, another Portuguese ship, the São Salvador, drove towards the entangled VOC ships and pierced headlong into the Middelburg, but was itself grappled by the Oranje from the side, which was in turn rammed from its open side by the ship of Dom Henrique de Noronha (the Nossa Senhora das Mercês). Four ships were now entangled. A battle raged between the entangled ships, with point-blank cannonades quickly setting the ships ablaze.

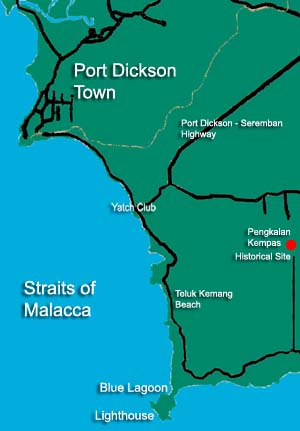
Location of the lighthouse of Cape Rachado and town of Port Dickson

Into this confusion entered the galleon of Dom Duarte de Guerra, who sought to toss a line to help tow Noronha's ship away from the burning Oranje. But the winds were unfavorable and instead the rescuer found itself drifting straight across the bows of the entangled ships. Just then the Mauritius joined the fight and pierced Dom Duarte de Guerra's ship from the other side. There were now six ships entangled and burning.

Matelief de Jonge realized that the smaller Dutch ships wouldn't last long, and that they had to get untangled before the larger Portuguese dropped anchor. He ordered the Oranje to cut the grapple-lines' to the São Salvador, and sailed away. Noronha's Mercês was still tied to Oranje and was dragged along with it. The Mauritius also cut its grappling cables when it noticed Dom Duarte de Guerra's galleon had caught fire.

The remaining entangled ships—the Middelburg, the São Salvador, and Dom Duarte de Guerra's galleon—burned and went down together, still entangled.

The battle continued between Matelief's Oranje and Noronha's Mercês, which were still grappled. At length Matelief proposed a truce to Henrique de Noronha, to allow them to put out their fires and save their ships. Noronha agreed. But the Oranje had dropped anchor, and as the crews went about extinguishing the flames, the winds were sending the remaining Dutch ships towards the Oranje and the Portuguese ships away from it. Matelief, not wishing to exploit the truce he had proposed, magnanimously offered to cut the grapple and allow Noronha to slip away unmolested back to the Portuguese line. For this honourable gesture, Noronha swore never to personally fight Matelief again.

This final exchange displeased the vice-roy Martim Afonso de Castro, who would have preferred to allow Noronha's ship to continue burning and take the Dutch flagship down with it. Henrique de Noronha was dismissed from the command of the Mercês, and replaced.

Matelief de Jonge deemed that the losses suffered were too much and ordered the Dutch fleet to disengage and abandoned the fight. The battle was won by the Portuguese, but the failed Dutch attack marked the beginning of a serious threat to their dominance in the archipelago, which culminated in a massive Dutch-Johor-Aceh assault 30 years after which managed to capture Malacca.

=== Aftermath ===
The Dutch requested shelter from Johor and arrived at the Johor River on 19 August 1606. Overall the Dutch had lost Nassau and Middelburg. 150 Dutch were killed and more wounded, Johor allied losses amounted to several hundred. The Portuguese had lost São Salvador and Dom Duarte de Guerra's smaller galleon while suffering 500 deaths (Portuguese and allies). The battle also proved the tenacity of the Dutch in their war against the Portuguese, which caused the Sultan of Johor to fully commit to providing his armies, ships and resources. The Dutch, returned to Malacca two months later and found that the Portuguese fleet having left, leaving only 10 ships behind. The Dutch subsequently sank all 10 ships.

=== Shipwrecks and excavation ===
All four ships lost at Cape Rachado were found by Gerald Caba of CABACO Marine Pte Ltd, Singapore. They were recovered in 1995 under the supervision of Mensun Bound from Oxford University. Nassau was found about 8-nautical-mile (15 km) off the modern town of Port Dickson, Negeri Sembilan. The wreck was found with 15 cannons, cannonballs, ropes and wooden barrels with animal bones, coins and a Chinese jar. The wreckage of Middelburg, São Salvador and Dom Duarte de Guerra's galleon was found 0.7-nautical-mile (1.3 km) away from Nassau.

Some of the retrieved artefacts from Nassau are on display at the Lukut Museum in Port Dickson.
