= Rajadiraja Chola II =

Rajadhiraja Chola II இரண்டாம் இராஜாதிராஜ சோழன்
- Rajakesari
- Reign: 1163 C.E. - 1178 C.E.
- Predecessor: Rajaraja Chola II
- Successor: Kulothunga Chola III
- Born: Unknown
- Died: 1178 C.E.
- Queen: Unknown
- Issue: Unknown
- Mother: Daughter of Vikrama Chola

Rajadhiraja Chola II (1163 – 1178 C.E.) reigned as the Chola king succeeding Rajaraja Chola II. He was not the direct descendant of Rajaraja Chola II, but a grandson of Vikrama Chola by his daughter. Rajaraja Chola II chose Rajadhiraja as his heir as he did not have any sons of his own.

Soon after the installation of Rajadhiraja II, a fierce succession dispute in the Pandya country led to the intervention of the Chola and the Sinhalese rulers on opposite sides which brought misery to both. Out of the ashes of this civil war arose the Pandya power which in its renewed strength soon swallowed both the Chola and Sinhalese kingdoms.

== Pandya Civil War ==
After the conquest of the Pandya country by Kulothunga Chola I, the local Pandya princes were allowed to rule as they liked, subject to a vague suzerainty of the Cholas. Some Of the Pandyas were loyal to the Cholas as can be seen by one Parantaka Pandya took part in Kulothunga I's Kalinga campaigns. But after Kulothunga I, the cholas lost any little control they had over the Pandyas. There are hardly any inscriptions to be found in the Pandya country after the reign of Kulothunga Chola I.

About 1166 C.E. Parakrama Pandya in Madurai, and Kulasekara quarrelled about the succession and Kulasekara attacked Madurai. Parakrama appealed to the Lanka king Parakramabahu I. Before the Sinhala help could reach Parakrama, Kulasekara took Madurai and killed Parakarama, his wife and some of his children. The sinhala king instructed his general to continue to war until Kulasekara is defeated and the Pandaya throne is bestowed upon a son of Parakrama Pandya.

Kulasekara put up a good fight and the Sinhala forces had to get reinforcements from Lanka. Kulasekara then appealed to Rajadhiraja Chola II, and a large force was sent to his aid. However Kulasekara lost his fight against the Lankan forces. The Lankan general installed Virapandya, a son of Parakrama Pandya on the throne. The fight continued between the Chola forces and that of the Sinhala. The Chola army soon defeated the Sinhalese forces and drove them back to the island.

Parakramabahu prepared a counter offensive against the Chola mainland. On hearing this the Chola general induced Srivallabha, a rival of Parakramabahu to the Sinhala throne to undertake an invasion of the Lanka island. A naval expedition landed in Lanka and attacked and destroyed many places. Seeing the damage his support of Parakrama Pandya had brought to him, Parakramabahu recognised Kulasekara as the rightful king of the Pandyas, and entered into an alliance with him against the Cholas. Cholas discovered Kulasekara's treachery and changed their policy at once. After further fighting, the Cholas set up Virapandya on the Pandya throne and drove Kulasekara into exile

== Empire weakens ==
The growing independence of the local feudatories and chieftains started during Rajaraja Chola II became more pronounced in Rajadhiraja's reign. They began to extend more and more of their influences in the central government. This manipulation of the king's authority undermined the central administration to effectively exercise its control over the local government areas of the country.

The growth of these feudatories had two consequences. The first was to weaken the prestige of the king's government by increasingly restricting the sphere of its influence and thereby to loosen its hold the rest of the administration. Secondly they began to form alliances and compacts with each other to convert the official positions they held within the Chola nobility into a hereditary right.

== Death and succession ==
Rajadhiraja died in 1178C.E. and Kulothunga Chola III ascended the throne.
