= Varodaya Cinkaiariyan =

Cekaracacekaran III
- King of Jaffna
- Reign: 1302–1325
- Predecessor: Vickrama Cinkaiariyan (Pararacacekaran II)
- Successor: Martanda Cinkaiariyan (Pararacacekaran III)
- Died: 1325
- Issue: Martanda Cinkaiariyan (Pararacacekaran III)
Names
- Varodaya Cinkaiariyan
- Tamil: வரோதய சிங்கையாரியன்
- House: Aryacakravarti dynasty
- Father: Vickrama Cinkaiariyan (Pararacacekaran II)

Varodaya Cinkaiariyan (Tamil: வரோதய சிங்கையாரியன்) (reigned from 1302 - 1325) was the first of the Aryacakravarti kings of Jaffna Kingdom to take over the lucrative pearl fisheries that were in the hands of the Pandyan Empire. He is also credited as having helped the Pandyas in their last few years and invaded the southern Dambadeniya-based kingdoms. He increasingly took part in the burgeoning Indian Ocean-based commerce.

== Notes ==
Preceded by Vickrama Cinkaiariyan	Jaffna Kingdom; 1302–1325	Succeeded by Martanda Cinkaiariyan
