= Gunabhooshana Cinkaiariyan =

Gunabhooshana Cinkaiariyan Cekaracacekaran IV
- King of Jaffna
- Reign: 1348–1371
- Predecessor: Martanda Cinkaiariyan (Pararacacekaran III)
- Successor: Virodaya Cinkaiariyan
Names
- Gunabhooshana Cinkaiariyan
- House: Aryacakravarti dynasty
- Father: Martanda Cinkaiariyan (Pararacacekaran III)

Gunabhooshana Cinkaiariyan was a king of the Aryacakravarti dynasty reigned from 1348–1371 and he ruled over the Jaffna Kingdom in modern Sri Lanka. Yalpana Vaipava Malai indicates that he was the son of Martanda Cinkaiariyan. He was a popular king than his father due to his contribution on education, employment, etc. During his rule, the country was firm and steady.

== Notes ==
Preceded by Martanda Cinkaiariyan	Jaffna Kingdom; 1348-1371	Succeeded by Virodaya Cinkaiariyan
