= Kasi Nayinar Pararacacekaran =

Kasi Nayinar
- King of Jaffna
- Reign: 1565–1570
- Predecessor: Puviraja Pandaram
- Successor: Periyapillai
- Died: 1570
Names
- Kasi Nayinar Pararacacekaran
- Tamil: பெரியபிள்ளை
- House: Aryacakravarti dynasty

Kasi Nayinar Pararacacekaran (Tamil: காசி நயினார் பரராஜசேகரன்; died 1570) was a ruler of the Jaffna Kingdom in the chaotic period following the death of Cankili I (1519–1561). He seized power by usurping the previous king, Puviraja Pandaram, despite not belonging to the royal lineage. Opposition forces frequently questioned his legitimacy and sought to claim the kingship for themselves.

Unable to gather sufficient public support to overthrow Kasi Nayinar, his enemies turned to the Portuguese, who controlled the Mannar territory adjacent to the Jaffna kingdom. The Portuguese, having territorial and economic ties with the region, saw an opportunity and initiated a covert military campaign against King Kasi Nayinar. Catching him by surprise, they quickly defeated him in battle, captured him, and imprisoned him.

The Portuguese then installed a puppet-king with state sponsorship. However, this attempt failed as Kasi Nayinar's supporters mobilized, leading to the demise of the Portuguese-sponsored ruler. Seizing the opportunity, Kasi Nayinar reclaimed his position as the legitimate ruler of Jaffna, gaining popular support.

Despite his turbulent journey to power, Kasi Nayinar faced a significant threat from the Portuguese Kingdom. Determined to remove him, the Portuguese chose a different approach this time: outright assassination. They infiltrated the Jaffna King's inner circle using a servant who agreed to carry out the poisoning plot. Soon after reclaiming his kingship, Kasi Nayinar fell victim to this Portuguese-directed poisoning and died.

Ultimately, the Portuguese Kingdom succeeded in eliminating Kasi Nayinar as one of the notable "People's Kings" of the region during that era.

== Notes ==
Preceded by Puviraja Pandaram	Jaffna Kingdom; 1565–1570	Succeeded by Periyapillai
