= Martanda Cinkaiariyan =

Pararacacekaran III
- King of Jaffna
- Reign: 1325–1348
- Predecessor: Varodaya Cinkaiariyan (Cekaracacekaran III)
- Successor: Gunabhooshana Cinkaiariyan (Cekaracacekaran IV)
- Died: 1348
- Issue: Gunabhooshana Cinkaiariyan (Cekaracacekaran IV)
Names
- Martanda Cinkaiariyan
- Tamil: மார்த்தாண்ட சிங்கையாரியன்
- House: Aryacakravarti dynasty
- Father: Varodaya Cinkaiariyan (Cekaracacekaran III)

Martanda Cinkaiariyan (Tamil: மார்த்தாண்ட சிங்கையாரியன்) (reigned from 1325 - 1348) ascended the throne of Jaffna Kingdom under the throne name Pararasasekaram III. He is one of the early Aryacakravarti kings about whom historical and epigraphical evidence is available. He was noted by Ibn Battuta in his well-known travelogue as well as he has left behind a few inscriptions. He oversaw the international trade of the Jaffna kingdom with Yemen via the kingdom's powerful trading ships. Martanda Cinkaiariyan accompanied Battuta to the peak of Sivanoli Padam Malai along with Yogis and other Hindus and companions of the king who visited the sacred Shiva site annually.

== Ibn Battuta ==
Ibn Battuta, a Moroccan traveller described his rule in his travelogue. Ibn Battuta mentions that the King had a large navy, and was seen trading in pearls, cinnamon and ahil and had cordial relationship with Indian rulers. In his travelogue it was noted that the king has encamped in the Puttalam are where he had his seasonal capital. He was encamped due to the pearling season.

== Military exploits ==
The primary source such as Yalpana Vaipava Malai records that Martanda was forced to subdue Vanniar chieftains from the Vanni region who had rebelled against him. An inscription dated in the 3rd regnal year of Vikramabahu III (1357–1374), found at the Medawala Rajamaha Vihara in the Kandy District records a treaty between that king and an Aryacakravarti named Martanda (Sin ai Ariyan) of Jaffna. In the Medawala inscriptions of 1359 found near a bo-tree at Medawala in Harispattuva reveals that Martanda appointed tax collectors to collect taxes from the villages of Sinduruvana, Balawita, Matale, Dumbara and Sagamathunarata which belonged to the Gampola kingdom.

It is believed that because of Martanda's incursions into Four Korales (a medieval division of Western Sri Lanka) belonging to Gampola kingdom as well as other sections of Udarata kingdom came under the control of Jaffna kingdom. The Rajaveliya a primary source written during that period too refers to the fact that the Aryacakravartis collected taxes from Udarata and Southern lowlands. Some historians attribute the Kotagama inscriptions which describes a victory by an unknown Aryacakravarti to him but others date it to the 15th century based on language usage.

== Notes ==
| Preceded by Varodaya Cinkaiariyan | Jaffna Kingdom; 1325–1348 | Succeeded by Gunabhooshana Cinkaiariyan |
