= Periyapillai =

Cekaracacekaran VIII
- King of Jaffna
- Reign: 1565–1582
- Predecessor: Puviraja Pandaram (Pararacacekaran VII)
- Successor: Puviraja Pandaram (Pararacacekaran VII)
- Died: 1582
- Issue: Cankili II (Cekaracacekaran IX)? Migapulle Arachchi
Names
- Periyapillai
- Tamil: பெரியபிள்ளை
- House: Aryacakravarti dynasty

Periyapillai (Tamil: பெரியபிள்ளை) (reigned from 1565 - 1582) was of one of the Aryacakravarti rulers of Jaffna kingdom who followed in the chaotic period after the death of Cankili I(1519–1561). Some sources claim that he deposed the Cankili I's son, Puviraja Pandaram as soon as Cankili I died. Others say that there was an intermediate ruler named Kasi Nainar between him and the death of Cankili I. He with the help of Thanjavur Nayak help mounted an attack on the Portuguese fort in the Mannar Island to regain territory lost during Cankili's rule but he was defeated. Due to a local uprising he lost power to Puviraja Pandaram. He is considered to be the father (or grandfather) of the last king of the Kingdom, Cankili II and Migapulle Arachchi.

== Notes ==
Preceded by Puviraja Pandaram	Jaffna Kingdom; 1565 –1582	Succeeded by Puviraja Pandaram
