= Puviraja Pandaram =

Pararacacekaran VII
- King of Jaffna
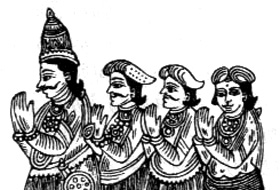
- Second from the left is Puviraja Pandaram
- Reign: 1561–1565; 1582–1591
- Predecessor: Cankili I (Cekaracacekaran VII); Periyapillai (Cekaracacekaran VIII)
- Successor: Periyapillai (Cekaracacekaran VIII); Ethirimana Cinkam (Pararacacekaran VIII)
- Died: 1591
- Issue: Ethirimana Cinkam (Pararacacekaran VIII)
Names
- Puviraja Pandaram
- Tamil: புவிராஜ பண்டாரம்
- House: Aryacakravarti dynasty
- Father: Cankili I (Cekaracacekaran VII)

Puviraja Pandaram (Tamil: புவிராஜ பண்டாரம்) (reigned from 1561 - 1565 & 1582 - 1591) ruled the Jaffna kingdom during a period of chaos during and after the death of his father Cankili I in 1565. He became king in 1561 following a local uprising against Cankili I. Although he was the nominal king, Cankili I wielded real power behind the throne until his death in 1565. After Cankili's death, Puviraja Pandaram lost power to one Kasi Nainar and Periyapillai. After the death or abdication of Periyapillai in 1582, Puviraja Pandaram was nominated as the king for the second time.

During his second tenure he attempted to wrest the control of the pearl-rich Mannar Island from the Portuguese by attacking the fort by sea and land. He was defeated in both attempts.

After the occupation of Kandy by Rajasinha I of Sitawaka, Puviraja Pandaram gave refuge and protection to the sole surviving member of the Kandyan Royal family, the infant, Princess Kusumasana, who was baptized, as Dona Catherina (The daughter of Karaliedde Bandara).

Eventually Puviraja Pandaram was captured and beheaded by Portuguese in a battle during the second Portuguese expedition against Jaffna Kingdom led by André Furtado de Mendonça in 1591. He was succeeded by his son Ethirimana Cinkam.

== Notes ==
Preceded by Cankili I	Jaffna kingdom 1561–1565	Succeeded by Ethirimana Cinkam
Preceded by Periyapillai	Jaffna kingdom 1582–1591	Succeeded by Ethirimana Cinkam
