= Virodaya Cinkaiariyan =

- King of Jaffna
- Reign: 1371-1380
- Predecessor: Gunabhooshana Cinkaiariyan
- Successor: Jeyaveera Cinkaiariyan
Names
- Virodaya Cinkaiariyan
- Tamil: வீரோதய சிங்கையாரியன்
- House: Aryacakravarti dynasty

Virodaya Cinkaiariyan (Tamil: வீரோதய சிங்கையாரியன்) was the Aryacakravarti king of the Jaffna Kingdom reigned from 1371 - 1380 in modern-day northern Sri Lanka. Tamil historical writer C. Rasanayagam calculated Virodaya Cinkaiariyan's reign was from 1371 to 1394 while Swamy Gnanapirakasar calculated from 1344 to 1380. During his reign, Vanniar incited Sinhalese for rebellion, which resulted suppression of rebellion, Virodaya’ innovation against Vanniar and they suffered.

== Notes ==
Preceded by Gunabhooshana Cinkaiariyan	Jaffna Kingdom; 1371-1380	Succeeded by Jeyaveera Cinkaiariyan
