= Kulotunga Cinkaiariyan =

Kulotunga Cinkaiariyan Cekaracacekaran II
- King of Jaffna
- Reign: (1284-1292)
- Predecessor: Kulasekara Cinkaiariyan
- Successor: Vickrama Cinkaiariyan
Names
- Kulotunga Cinkaiariyan
- Tamil: குலோத்துங்க சிங்கையாரியன்
- House: Aryacakravarti dynasty
- Father: Kulasekara Cinkaiariyan

Kulotunga Cinkaiariyan (Tamil: குலோத்துங்க சிங்கையாரியன்) reigned from 1284 - 1292 was the third of the Aryacakravarti kings of Jaffna Kingdom. Author of the book “Ancient Jaffna” C. Rasanayagam calculated that he has been ruled Jaffna from 1256 to 1279 (23 years). Yalpana Vaipava Malai says he followed his ancestor and promoted agriculture, and he converted waste land into agriculture land. Also the book added that during his rule the kingdom was peaceful and prosper.

== Notes ==
Preceded by Kulasekara Cinkaiariyan	Jaffna Kingdom; 1284-1292	Succeeded by Vickrama Cinkaiariyan
