= Vickrama Cinkaiariyan =

Vickrama Cinkaiariyan Pararacacekaran II
- King of Jaffna
- Reign: 1292-1302
- Predecessor: Kulotunga Cinkaiariyan
- Successor: Varodaya Cinkaiariyan
Names
- Vickrama Cinkaiariyan
- Tamil: விக்கிரம சிங்கையாரியன்
- House: Aryacakravarti dynasty
- Father: Kulotunga Cinkaiariyan

Vickrama Cinkaiariyan (Tamil: விக்கிரம சிங்கையாரியன்) reigned from 1292-1302 was the fourth of the Aryacakravarti kings of Jaffna Kingdom. Author of the book “Ancient Jaffna” C. Rasanayagam calculated that he has been ruled Jaffna from 1279 to 1302 (23 years). Yalpana Vaipava Malai says during his rule the county was in disorder. Riot occurred between Sinhalese and Tamils. Vickrama Cinkaiariyan ordered death sentences 17 Sinhalese and imprisoned many Sinhalese after the murder of 2 Tamils.

Mayilvagana Pulavar, the author of Yalpana Vaipava Malai, described the event;

A great disturbance arose between the Singhalese of this place who were Budhhists, and the Tamils, in matters connected with religion. In an affray between the fractions two Tamils were killed and a few wounded. The king inquired in to the matter and executed Pugnchi-Banda, the ring leader of Singhalese, with seventeen of his followers and punished the rest of the offenders with imprisonment. Many of the Singhalese fled from the country, while those that remained behind cherished an intense hatred of the king on account of his partiality to the Tamils and made him spend the rest of his life in constant dread of plots and insurrections. He died in the midst of his anxieties ...

== Notes ==
Preceded by Kulotunga Cinkaiariyan	Jaffna Kingdom; 1292-1302	Succeeded by Varodaya Cinkaiariyan
