= Cankili I =

Cekaracacekaran VII Cankili I
- King of the Jaffna Kingdom
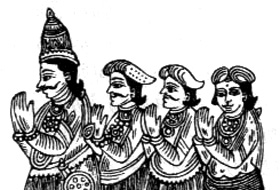
- First from the right is Cankili I
- Reign: 1519–1561
- Predecessor: Singai Pararasasegaram (Pararacacekaran VI)
- Successor: Puviraja Pandaram (Pararacacekaran VII)
- Born: Nallur
- Died: 1565; Nallur
- Burial: Nallur
- Issue: Puviraja Pandaram (Pararacacekaran VII)
- Cankilian Sekarasasekaran
- Tamil: சங்கிலியன்
- House: Aryacakravarti dynasty
- Father: Singai Pararasasegaram (Pararacacekaran VI)
- Mother: Mangathammal

Cankili I (Tamil: சங்கிலியன்) (reigned from 1519 - 1565), also known as Segarasasekaram (Jaga Rajasekharam), is the most remembered Jaffna kingdom king in the Sri Lankan Tamil history. He was active in resisting Portuguese colonial inroads into Sri Lanka. He inherited his throne via palace intrigues in which a number of heirs died under mysterious circumstances. Ultimately, he was removed from power by a local uprising that led to his son Puviraja Pandaram taking nominal power from him.

== Biography ==
His father, Singai Pararasasegaram, had two principal wives and a number of concubines. His first wife, Rajalaksmi, had two sons, Singhabahu and Pandaram. Singai Pararasasegaram second wife was Valliammal; they couple were the parents of Paranirupasingham. Cankili's mother had Cankili and a daughter named Paravai. As part of palace intrigues, Cankili was able to ascend the throne.

== Rule ==
According to a letter by Andre de Souza, ordered Cankili I on November 1544 the murder of his eldest son for converting to Catholicism. The son was buried on the spot he was killed, where a chapel was built that later on served as the foundation for the construction of the present St. Mary's Cathedral at Jaffna.

Cankili I resisted all contacts with the Portuguese, maintained relationships with Kunjali Marakkar got assistance from and even massacred 600 – 700 Parava Catholics in the island of Mannar who were brought from India to Mannar by the Portuguese to take over the lucrative pearl fisheries from the Jaffna kings. He was removed from power due to a local uprising that led his son Puviraja Pandaram take nominal power. He wielded real power behind the throne until his death in 1565.

== In popular culture ==
In the 2022 Sri Lankan Sinhalese-Tamil-English trilingual film Praana directed by Sanjaya Nirmal, Cankili I is played by Darshan Dharmaraj.

== Notes ==
Preceded by Singai Pararasasegaram	Jaffna Kingdom; 1519–1561	Succeeded by Puviraja Pandaram
