= History of the Jaffna kingdom =

When to date the start of the history of the Jaffna kingdom is debated among historians.

== Background ==
=== Sangam period ===
The name 'Ko Veta' is engraved in Brahmi script on a seal buried with the skeleton and is assigned by the excavators to the 3rd century BCE. Ko, meaning "King" in Tamil, is comparable to such names as Ko Atan, Ko Putivira and Ko Ra-pumaan occurring in contemporary Tamil Brahmi inscriptions of ancient South India and Egypt.

Potsherds with early Tamil writing from the 2nd century BCE have been found from the north in Poonagari, Jaffna to the south in Tissamaharama bearing several inscriptions, including of the clan name velir, chieftains and minor Tamil kings also residing in the ancient Tamil country. Sangam literature from the 3rd century BCE-4th century CE illustrate that a section of the island Eelam, known as Nāka-Tivu or Nāka-Nadu at the time, was autonomously ruled by local kings in the northern peninsula. The early emporiums of the north and east such as Manthai, Kandarodai (Kadiramalai), Vallipuram, Anaikottai attest Tamil presence through finds of Tamil-Brahmi scripts, coins by the Tamil Three Crowned Kings, Black and red ware pots and beads similar to those found in Arikamedu and Karaikudi.

=== References in epics ===
The twin epics of ancient Tamil Nadu Silappatikaram (1st century CE) and Manimekalai (6th century CE) speak of Nāka Nadu across the sea from Kaveripoompuharpattinam, and their civilization which was even more sumptuous than those of the Cheras, the Cholas and the Pandyas. Manimekalai speaks of the great Nāka king Valai Vanan who ruled the prosperous Nāka Nadu with great splendour and a rich Tamil Buddhist tradition. Cīttalai Cāttanār, the author of the Manimekalai reflected Tamilakam's perception at the time that Nāka Nadu was an autonomous administrative entity, kingdom or nadu stretching across coastal districts, distinguished from the rest of the island also ruled intermittently by Tamil kings; Eela or Irattina Tivu-Nadu. Jaffna is an anglicized rendering of the medieval Tamil name for the northern peninsula, Yaalpaanam or Yaalpanapattinam.

There is scattered literary and archeological evidence from local and foreign sources describing the division of the whole island in the first few centuries of the common era between two kingdoms. The accounts of 6th century Greek merchant Cosmas Indicopleustes who visited the island around the time of King Simhavishnu of Pallava's rule in Tamilakam reveal the presence of two kings, one of whom was based in Jaffna, home to a great emporium, who ruled the coastal districts. In the ninth century CE, as the medieval Cholas regained strength in the region, a Tamil kingdom based in Jaffna was functioning in rivalry to the south, as described in narratives by Arab travellers such as Soleyman (Suleiman), Ibn Vahab and writing sixty years later, Abu-Zeyd. The historian Al-Masudi identifies Yaalpaanam as Zapage or Zabedje in his 10th century work The Meadows of Gold and describes how the island peninsula's Maharaja (Hindu king) wielded sovereignty over islands opposite the kingdom of Kanyakumari, Karativu island (or Kala island, home to the ancient port of Kalam where ships docked for water on their way to the Nicobar Islands), the islands Zadig, Sarendib and Rameswaram Island. He visited the Jaffna country and the lands of Ramanathapuram which extended both inland and on sea at the time. Masudi witnessed the funeral of a Tamil Hindu king during his stay in Jaffna. Muhammad al-Idrisi writes in the 10th century that the king of Jaffna (Jabeh) rules his island country of the same name (in an apparent reference to the minstrel Yaalpaanan to whom the kingdom was gifted) and in the neighbourhood of this country are the islands of Karativu and Eluvaitivu which also obey his rule. Rajadhiraja Chola's conquest of the island led to the fall of four kings there, one of whom, Madavarajah, was the king of Jaffna and, according to historian K. Pillay, a usurper from the Rashtrakuta dynasty. Inscriptions from the period reveal that the Cholas defeated three Jaffna kings during their conquest of the island.

== Founding and early history ==
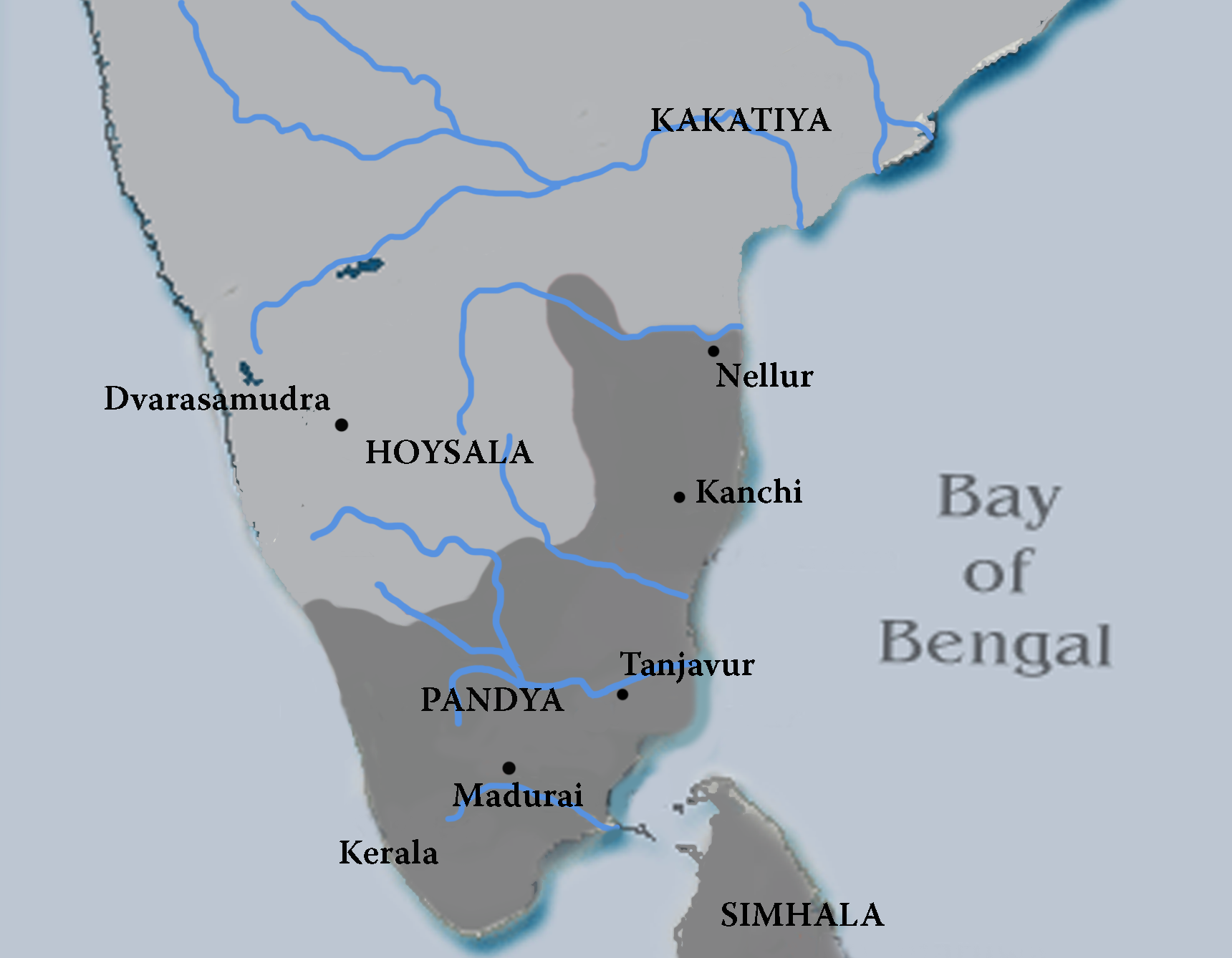
Pandyan tribute paying territories circa 1250, includes what ultimately became the Jaffna kingdom in Sri Lanka

The origin of the Jaffna kingdom is obscure and still the subject of controversy among historians. Among mainstream historians, such as K. M. de Silva, S. Pathmanathan and Karthigesu Indrapala, the widely accepted view is that the Kingdom of the Aryacakravarti dynasty in Jaffna began in 1215 with the invasion of a previously unknown chieftain called Magha, who claimed to be from Kalinga in modern India. He deposed the ruling Parakrama Pandyan II, a foreigner from the Pandyan dynasty who was ruling the Kingdom of Polonnaruwa at the time with the help of his soldiers and mercenaries from the Kalinga, modern Kerala and Damila (Tamil Nadu) regions in India.

After the conquest of Rajarata, he moved the capital to the Jaffna Peninsula which was more secured by heavy Vanni forest and ruled as a tribute-paying subordinate of the Chola Empire of Tanjavur, in modern Tamil Nadu, India. During this period (1247), a Malay chieftain from Tambralinga in modern Thailand named Chandrabhanu invaded the politically fragmented island. Although King Parakramabahu II (1236–70) from Dambadeniya was able to repulse the attack, Chandrabhanu moved north and secured the throne for himself around 1255 from Magha. This prompted the Pandyan Empire in modern South India to intervene and Chandrabhanu submitted to Pandya rule in 1258.

== Aryacakravarti dynasty ==
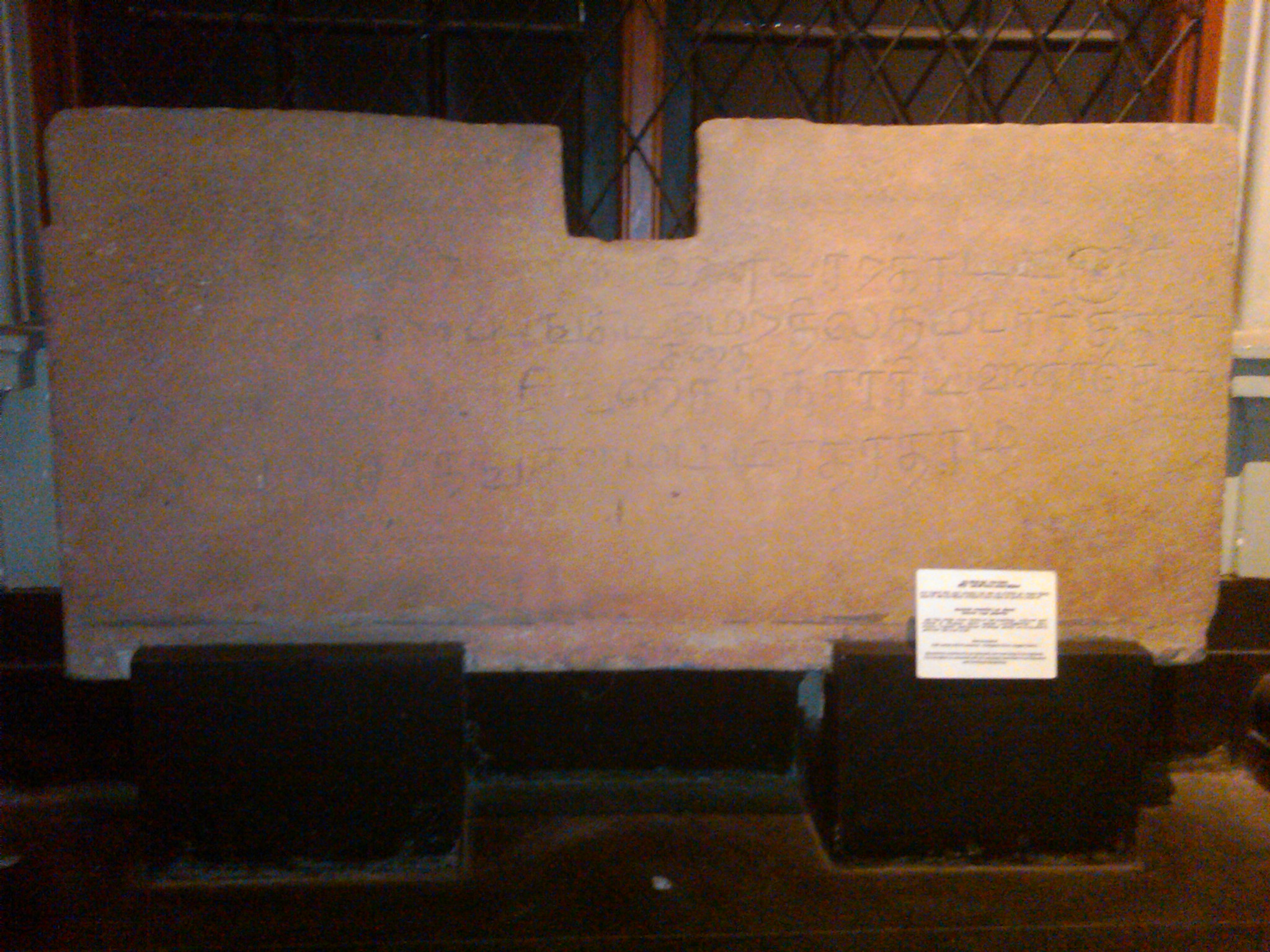
Kotagma inscription of Jaffna kings as displayed in the National Museum of Colombo.

When Chandrabhanu embarked on a second invasion of the south, the Pandyas again came to the support of the Sinhalese king and killed Chandrabhanu in 1262 and installed Aryacakravarti, a minister in charge of the invasion, as the king. When the Pandyan Empire became weak due to Muslim invasions, successive Aryacakravarti rulers made the Jaffna kingdom independent and a regional power to reckon with in Sri Lanka. All subsequent kings of the Jaffna kingdom claimed descent from one Kulingai Cakravarti who is identified with Kalinga Magha by Swami Gnanaprakasar and Mudaliar Rasanayagam while maintaining their Pandyan progenitor's family name. The origins of the Aryacakravarti are claimed in contemporary court chronicles but modern historians offer competing theories as well. The consensus held by historians is that they were a Pandyan feudatory family and the family is connected to the Ramanathapuram Hindu temple and was of Tamil Brahmin origin. C. Rasanayagam investigated why they called of themselves as Arya Chakravarthis; and states that when the Jaffna kingdom fell into the hands of the Portuguese in 1618, the Jaffna kings claimed to have "descended from two Brahmin kings who were appointed by Rama himself after his conquest of Lanka and establishment of the Rameshwavaram temple". The Jaffna kings also claimed that Lord Rama himself gave them the title of Arya and granted them the parasol and the emblem of Setu. Rasanayagam therefore suggested that the Brahmin connection may have been mythical and adopted by the later kings as they grew in eminence.

The dynasty claimed titles such as Setukavalan meaning custodians of the Rameswaram temple in modern India, Singaiariyan (from the city of Singai Nagar, another name for their capital Nallur), and Gangainadan, alluding to their origin from the Ganga dynasty or the Ganges region of modern North India. Politically, it was an expanding power in the 13th and 14th century with all regional kingdoms paying tribute to it. However, it met with simultaneous confrontations with the Vijayanagar Empire that ruled from Vijayanagara, southern India, and a rebounding Kingdom of Kotte from the south of Sri Lanka. This led to the kingdom becoming a vassal of the Vijyanagar Empire as well as briefly losing its independence under the Kotte kingdom from 1450 to 1467. The kingdom was re-established with the disintegration of Kotte kingdom and the fragmentation of Viyanagar Empire. It maintained very close commercial and political relationships with the Thanjavur Nayakar kingdom in southern India as well as the Kandyan and segments of the Kotte kingdom. This period saw the building of Hindu temples and a flourishing of literature, both in Tamil and Sanskrit.

== Kotte conquest and restoration ==
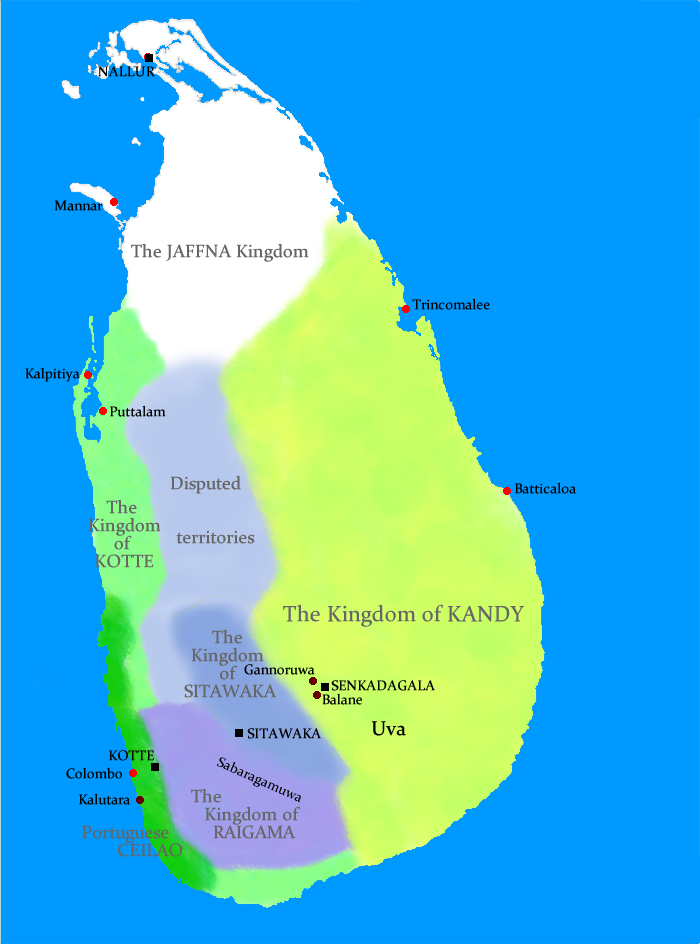
The position of Jaffna kingdom with respect to other regional powers circa 1520s

The Kotte conquest of the Jaffna kingdom was led by king Parakramabahu VI's adopted son, Prince Sapumal. This battle took place in many stages. Firstly, the tributaries to the Jaffna kingdom in the Vanni area, namely the Vanniar chieftains of the Vannimai were neutralised. This was followed by two successive conquests. The first war of conquest did not succeed in capturing the kingdom. It was the second conquest dated to 1450 that eventually was successful. Apparently connected with this war of conquest was an expedition to Adriampet in modern South India, occasioned according to Valentyn by the seizure of a Lankan ship laden with cinnamon. The Tenkasi inscription of Arikesari Parakrama Pandya of Tinnevelly 'who saw the backs of kings at Singai, Anurai,' and elsewhere, may refer to these wars; it is dated between A.D. 1449-50 and 1453–4. Kanakasooriya Cinkaiariyan the Aryacakravarti king fled to South India with his family. After the departure of Sapumal Kumara to Kotte, Kanakasooriya Cinkaiarian re-took the kingdom in 1467.

== Decline and dissolution ==
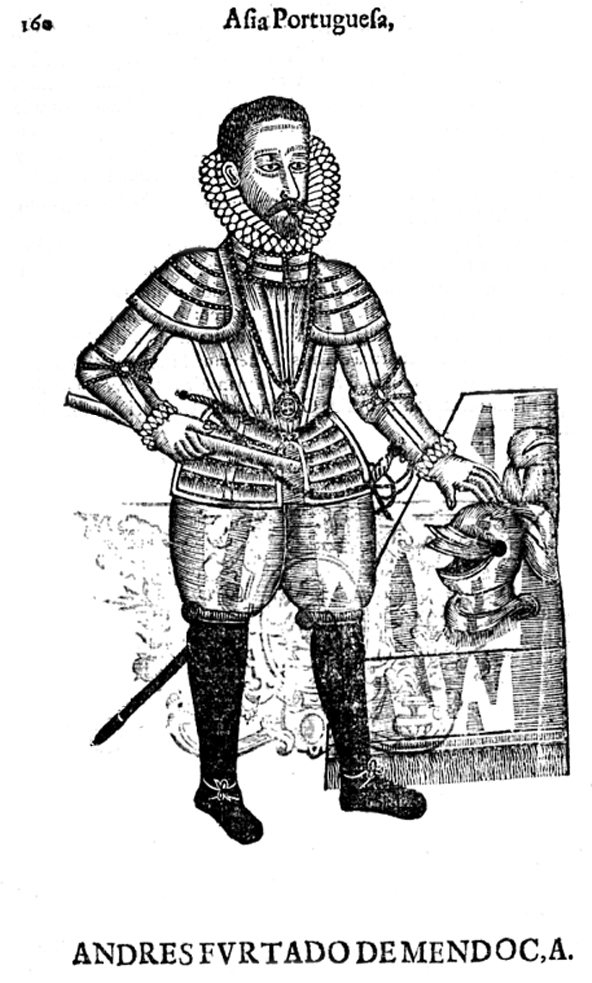
André Furtado de Mendonça, the Portuguese commander during the siege

Portuguese traders reached Sri Lanka by 1505 where their initial forays were against the south-western coastal Kotte kingdom due to the lucrative monopoly on trade in spices that the Kotte kingdom enjoyed that was also of interest to the Portuguese. The Jaffna kingdom came to the attention of Portuguese officials in Colombo for multiple reasons which included their interference in Roman Catholic missionary activities, (which was assumed to be patronizing Portuguese interests) and their support to anti-Portuguese factions of the Kotte kingdom, such as the chieftains from Sittawaka. The Jaffna kingdom also functioned as a logistical base for the Kandyan kingdom, located in the central highlands without access to any seaports, as an entrypost for military aid arriving from South India. Further, due to its strategic location, it was feared that the Jaffna kingdom may become a beachhead for the Dutch landings. It was king Cankili I who resisted contacts with the Portuguese and even massacred 600–700 Parava Catholics in the island of Mannar. These Catholics were brought from India to Mannar to take over the lucrative pearl fisheries from the Jaffna kings.

=== Client state ===
The first expedition led by Viceroy Constantino of Braganza in 1560 failed to subdue the kingdom but wrested the Mannar Island from it. Although the circumstances are unclear, by 1582 The Jaffna king was paying a tribute of ten (10) elephants or an equivalent in cash. In 1591, during the second expedition led by André Furtado de Mendonça, king Puvirasa Pandaram was killed and his son Ethirimana Cinkam was installed as the monarch. This arrangement gave the Catholic missionaries freedom and monopoly in elephant export to the Portuguese, which the incumbent king however resisted. He helped the Kandyan kingdom under kings Vimaladharmasuriya I and Senarat during the period 1593–1635 with the intent of securing help from South India to resist the Portuguese. He however maintained autonomy of the kingdom without overly provoking the Portuguese.

=== Cankili II the unsurper ===
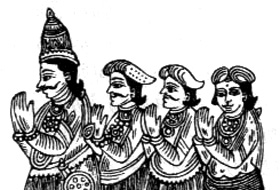
The royal family, first from the right is Cankili I, who held off the Portuguese Empire.

With the death of Ethirimana Cinkam in 1617, Cankili II, a usurper, took control of the throne after killing the regent nominated by the late king. Unable to secure Portuguese acceptance of his kingship, Cankili II through Migapulle Arachchi invited military aid from the Thanjavur Nayak kingdom and allowed corsairs from Malabar to use a base in Neduntivu, hence posting a threat to Portuguese shipping routes through Palk Straight. Cankili II was supported by the Kandyan rulers. After the fall of the Jaffna kingdom, the two unnamed princesses of Jaffna had been married to Senarat's stepsons, Kumarasingha and Vijayapala. Cankili II expectably received military aid from the Thanjavur Nayak Kingdom. On his part, Raghunatha Nayak of Thanjavur made attempts to recover the Jaffna kingdom for his protege, the Prince of Rameshwaram . However, all attempts to recover the Jaffna kingdom from the Portuguese met with failure.

By June 1619, there were two Portuguese expeditions: a naval expedition that was repulsed by the Malabari corsairs and another expedition by Filipe de Oliveira and his 5,000 strong army which was able to defeat Cankili II. He, along with every surviving member of the royal family were captured and taken to Goa, where he was beheaded. The remaining captives were encouraged to become monks or nuns, and as most obliged, it avoided further claimants to the Jaffna throne.

=== Consequences ===
Over the next 40 years, there were six rebellions against the Portuguese rule led by Karaiyar chiefs, one which were led by Migapulle Arachchi and Varunakulattan with the forces of Thanjavur Nayak kingdom after the invasion by the Kandyan king Senarat I until the Dutch capture of Jaffna fort in 1658. During that period, Portuguese destroyed every Hindu temple and the Saraswathy Mahal library in Nallur, the royal repository of all literary output of the kingdom. Due to excessive taxation, population decreased and many people moved to Ramanathapuram in India and the Vanni districts further south. External commerce was negatively impacted, though elephants, Jaffna's principle export, were traded for saltpetre with various kingdoms in India and sent to Lisbon. Thus, decline in trade made it difficult to pay for essential imports and such items ceased to be imported. In the words of Fernão de Queirós, the principle chronicler of Portuguese colonial exploits in Sri Lanka, the people of the Jaffna Peninsula were "reduced to the uttermost misery" during the Portuguese colonial era.

Although the Portuguese attempted to completely destroy the royal family through encouraged celibacy, there are number of families of Sri Lankan Tamil origin who claim descent from the royal family.
