= Battle of Vannarpannai =

- Part of Portuguese conquest of the Jaffna kingdom
Date	1619
Location	Vannarpannai, Sri Lanka
Result	Portuguese victory
Territorial changes	Jaffna Kingdom annexed into Portuguese Empire

Belligerents
Jaffna Kingdom; Thanjavur Nayaks	Portuguese Empire

Commanders and leaders
Cankili II (POW); Khem Nayak	(Portuguese Empire) Phillippe de Oliveira (Portuguese Empire) Antonio da Motta Galvão (Portuguese Empire) Francisco Pereira Velho

Strength
4,000	230 Portuguese; 3,000 Lascarins

The Battle of Vannarpannai was a battle fought in 1619 between the forces of Cankili II, the last ruler of the Jaffna Kingdom, and the Portuguese under Phillippe de Oliveira.

After arriving in Jaffna, Phillippe de Oliveira demanded tribute and the surrender of Varunakulattan Cankili's South Indian mercenary commander. When Cankili II refused, tensions escalated into open conflict. the battle took place at Vannarpannai where Cankili's army of around 4,000 soldiers, including local Tamil troops and Vadugai mercenaries, initially managed to repel the Portuguese lascarins. However, the Portuguese, supported by superior weaponry and discipline, launched a counterattack that decisively defeated Cankili's forces. Following the defeat, Cankili II attempted to flee to South India but was captured by the Portuguese. His mercenary commander, Varunakulattan managed to escape to Tanjore. the Battle of Vannarpannai marked the fall of the Jaffna Kingdom leading to its formal annexation into the Portuguese Empire.

== Background ==
The Portuguese approach to Jaffna during the reign of Cankili II was shaped by strategic priorities, particularly its role as a supply route for the Kandyan kingdom. While the King of Portugal ordered Jaffna's conquest and incorporation into the Portuguese Estado da Índia, Viceroy Jerónimo de Azevedo (1612–1617) lacked the necessary military resources to execute this plan. Consequently, he balanced diplomacy with strategic oversight, relaying the king's orders to Ceylon while maintaining relations with Jaffna. Instead of immediate military action, the Portuguese exercised indirect control by confirming the regencies of Arasakesari and Cankili II ensuring their influence over the region without direct intervention.

Initially, Viceroy Don João Coutinho believed that Azevedo's appointment of Cankili II would prevent Portuguese aggression against him. However, by August 1618, he changed his stance, recognizing the necessity of conquering Jaffna once the required forces became available. Reports from key Portuguese officials in Mannar further convinced the viceroy and his council that the time was ripe for action. Orders were subsequently sent to Francisco de Miranda Henriques, captain-major of the Malabar fleet, to lead the conquest. Meanwhile, before Henriques could arrive, Constantino de Sá de Noronha launched an expedition from Kotte against Cankili. This campaign was not aimed at deposing Cankili II but was a preventive measure to disrupt the movement of South Indian mercenaries into rebel-controlled territories and to counter Cankili's alleged efforts to ally with Senarat of Kandy and Mayadunne. Furthermore, reports of Cankili seeking Dutch assistance at Pulicat and intelligence in March 1619 about Pedro Rodrigues' arrival off Jaffna with five armed vessels presumably in response to Cankili's request raised concerns. Rodrigues, a cousin of the last Kunjali admiral of Calicut actively plundered Portuguese ships in the region.

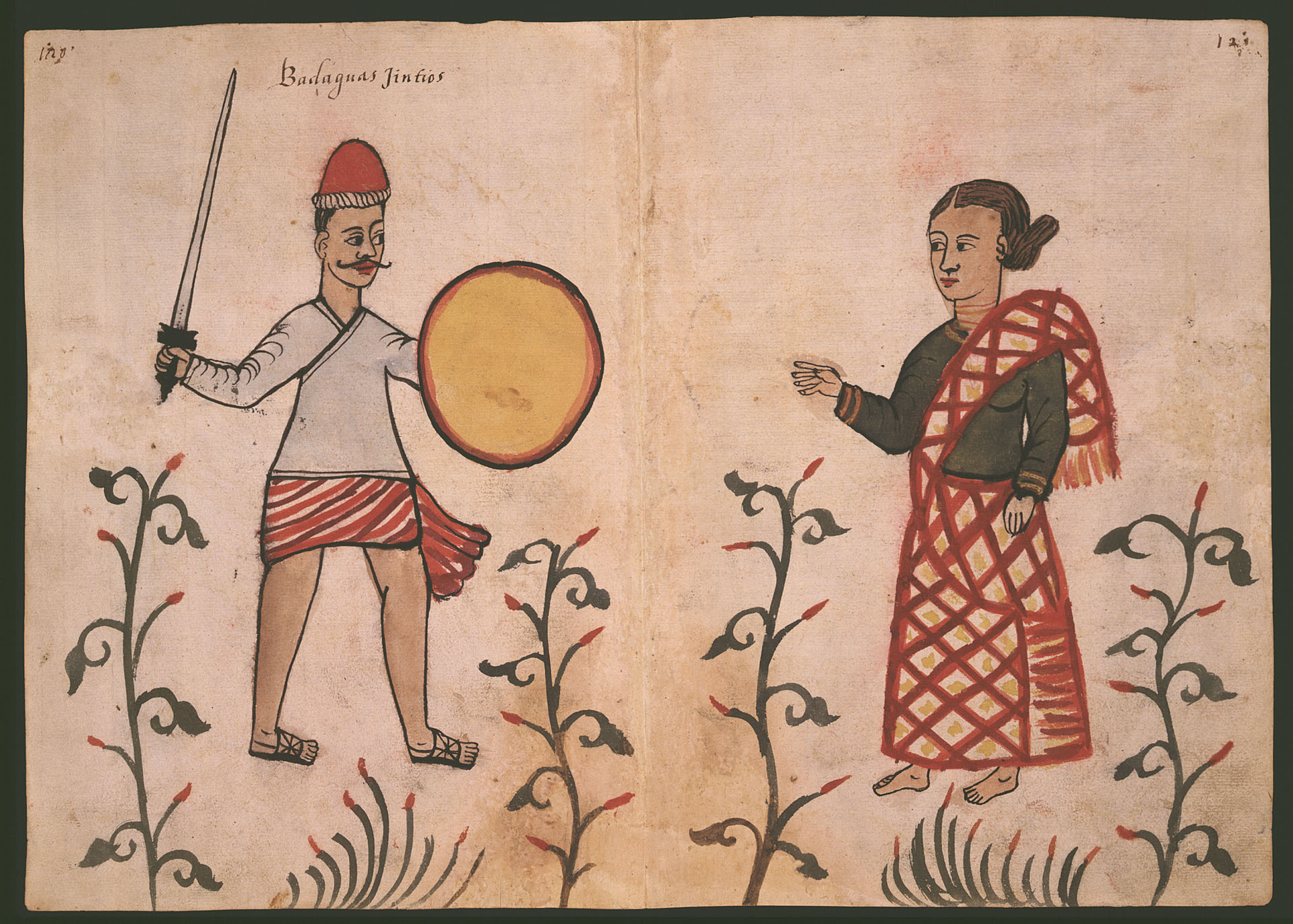
Vadugai or Badagas, depicted in the Códice Casanatense.

In addition to addressing security threats, Constantino de Sá de Noronha's expedition sought to reinforce Portuguese control over Jaffna's economy, particularly the lucrative elephant trade. The Portuguese relied on elephant exports from Kotte, with Jaffna serving as a key trading hub, but Cankili II's independent elephant trade created competition that threatened Portuguese profits. By asserting control over Jaffna, the Portuguese aimed to regulate prices and monopolize this market. Concerned that Cankili II with Dutch support and Don Pedro's fleet, might attack Mannar and destabilize Portuguese rule in Ceylon Constantino de Sá acted swiftly without waiting for reinforcements from Goa. Despite ongoing unrest in Kotte he assembled a force of 230 Portuguese soldiers and 3,000 lascarins deploying them in two groups. João da Silva and João Madeira led the first detachment by sea from Colombo to Mannar, while Phillippe de Oliveira advanced overland through the Seven Korales to Pooneryn. Their mission was to secure Mannar, eliminate Don Pedro's Malabar forces, and demand Jaffna's overdue tribute. If Cankili II refused to comply or was found guilty of conspiring against the Portuguese, Phillippe de Oliveira was authorized to annex Jaffna.

== Battle ==
Portuguese battle-standard featuring the cross of the Order of Christ.

Phillippe de Oliveira and his troops endured a challenging march through the arid terrain from Kotte before reaching Pooneryn, where they requested a ferry from Cankili II to cross into the Jaffna Peninsula. Despite complying with the request and providing boats, the crossing took eight days to complete. Seeking additional naval support, Oliveira consulted the captain of Mannar and sent for reinforcements from Negapatam. Throughout the Dom Pedro episode, Cankili II maintained a cooperative stance toward the Portuguese, refraining from aiding their enemies and even offering Jaffna as a safe harbor for their fleet. However, Oliveira's subsequent demands shattered any alliance. He insisted on the immediate payment of tribute and the surrender of Varunakulattan the commander of Cankili's South Indian mercenaries. This ultimatum threatened Cankili's military strength, prompting his refusal. He argued that part of the tribute had already been paid.

Realizing his vulnerable position with only about four thousand men, Cankili II sought to negotiate with Phillippe de Oliveira. He proposed that the Portuguese withdraw to Pooneryn in exchange for an immediate payment of five thousand pardaos, with a promise of another sum within three months. Additionally, he offered to send his Vadugai troops back to South India to ease tensions. While Oliveira accepted the initial payment, he did not withdraw. Instead, he advanced toward Vannarpannai leading to clashes between Portuguese lascarins and Cankili's forces. Though Cankili's troops initially gained the upper hand, they were eventually defeated. Attempting to flee by boat to South India Cankili and his family were forced back to Point Pedro by strong winds. A second escape attempt in a larger vessel failed when Portuguese forces captured him. Meanwhile, his mercenary commander, Varunakulattan successfully evaded capture and escaped to Tanjore.

== Aftermath ==
After capturing Cankili II Phillippe de Oliveira advanced to Nallur establishing his headquarters at the Hindu temple there. To maintain control, a detachment under Francisco Pereira Velho was stationed at the Franciscan church in Jaffna. With Cankili II's capture, all resistance collapsed, allowing Oliveira to officially annex the Kingdom of Jaffna into the Portuguese Empire in the name of the Portuguese king. Believing the region to be secure, Oliveira dispatched Antonio da Motta Galvão with one hundred Portuguese soldiers and most of the lascarins back to Kotte where reinforcements were needed. Additionally, da Motta was tasked with escorting Cankili II to Colombo, from where he was sent to Goa for trial.

== See also ==
- Kingdom of Jaffna
- Khem Nayak
- Portuguese Empire
