= Fort Fredrick =

Fort in Sri Lanka

Coordinates: 8°34′31″N 81°14′29″E

- Part of Trincomalee
- Trincomalee, Sri Lanka
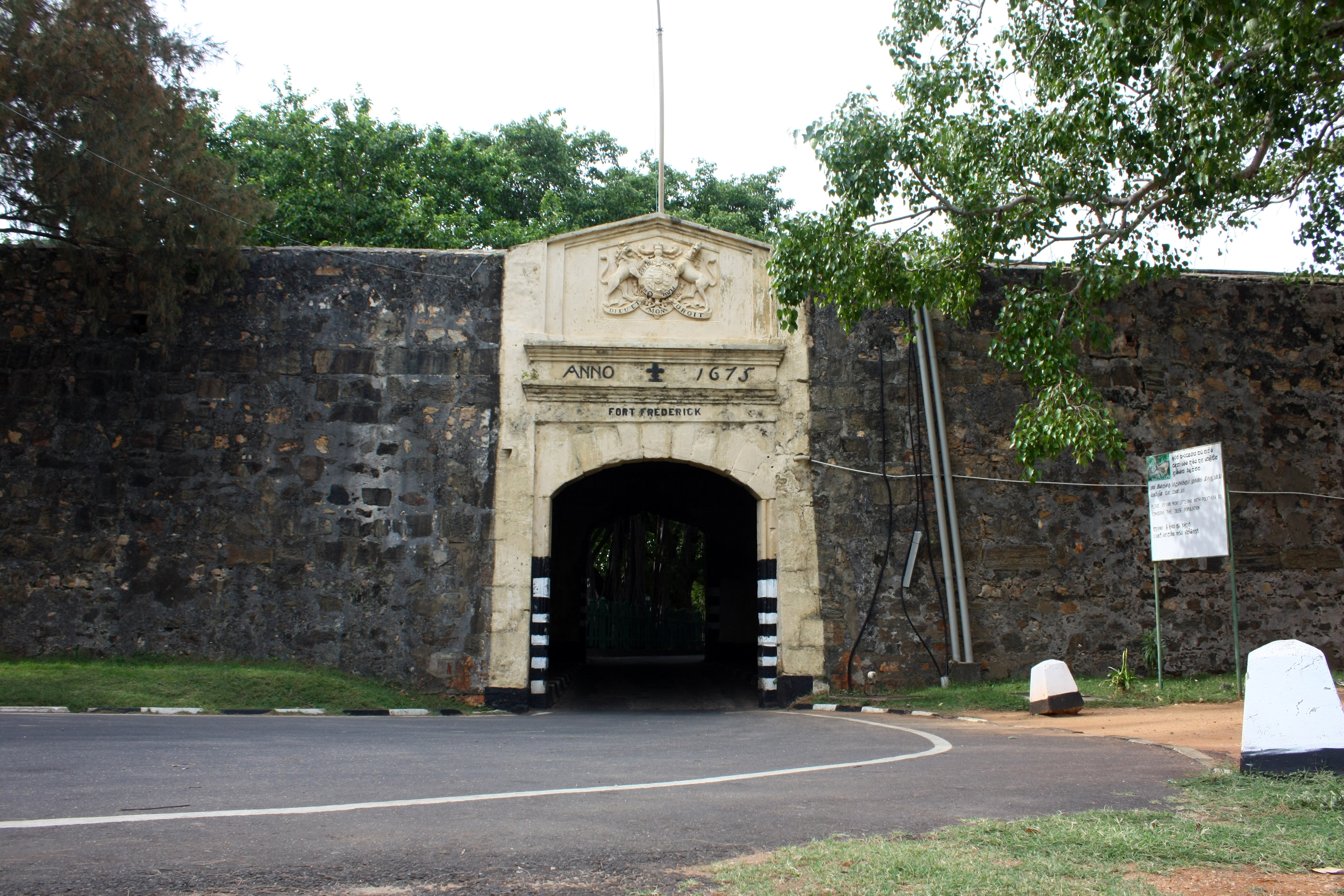
- Entrance of Fort Fredrick

Site information
- Type: Defense fort
- Controlled by: Government of Sri Lanka
- Open to the public: Yes
- Condition: Good

Location
- Location in central Trincomalee
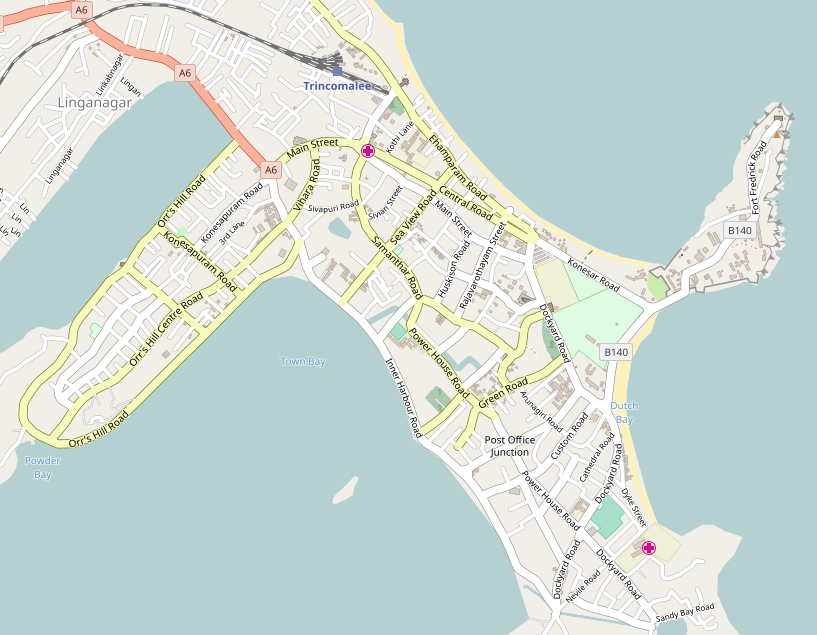
- Location within Central Trincomalee

Site history
- Built: 1623
- Built by: Portuguese, Dutch
- In use: 1623 - today
- Materials: granite, rock

Garrison information
- Occupants: Gajaba Regiment

Archaeological Protected Monument of Sri Lanka

Fort Fredrick (Tamil: திருகோணமலை கோட்டை, romanized: Tirukōṇamalai Kōṭṭai; Sinhala: ත්‍රිකුණාමලය බලකොටුව, romanized: Thrinkunamalaya Balakotuwa), also known as Trincomalee Fort or Fort of Triquillimale, is a fort built by the Portuguese at Trincomalee, Eastern Province, Sri Lanka, completed in 1624 CE, built on Swami Rock-Konamamalai from the debris of the world-famous ancient Hindu Koneswaram temple (Temple of a Thousand Pillars). The temple was destroyed by the Portuguese colonial Constantino de Sá de Noronha under Phillip III, occupier of the Jaffna kingdom and Malabar country on the island. On the Konamalai cape was also built a new village of Portuguese and Tamil people, 50 Portuguese soldiers and inside the fort, a church named after "Nossa Senhora de Guadalupe". The Fort of Triquillimale was dismantled and rebuilt by the Dutch in 1665, renamed Fort Fredrick.

== Background ==
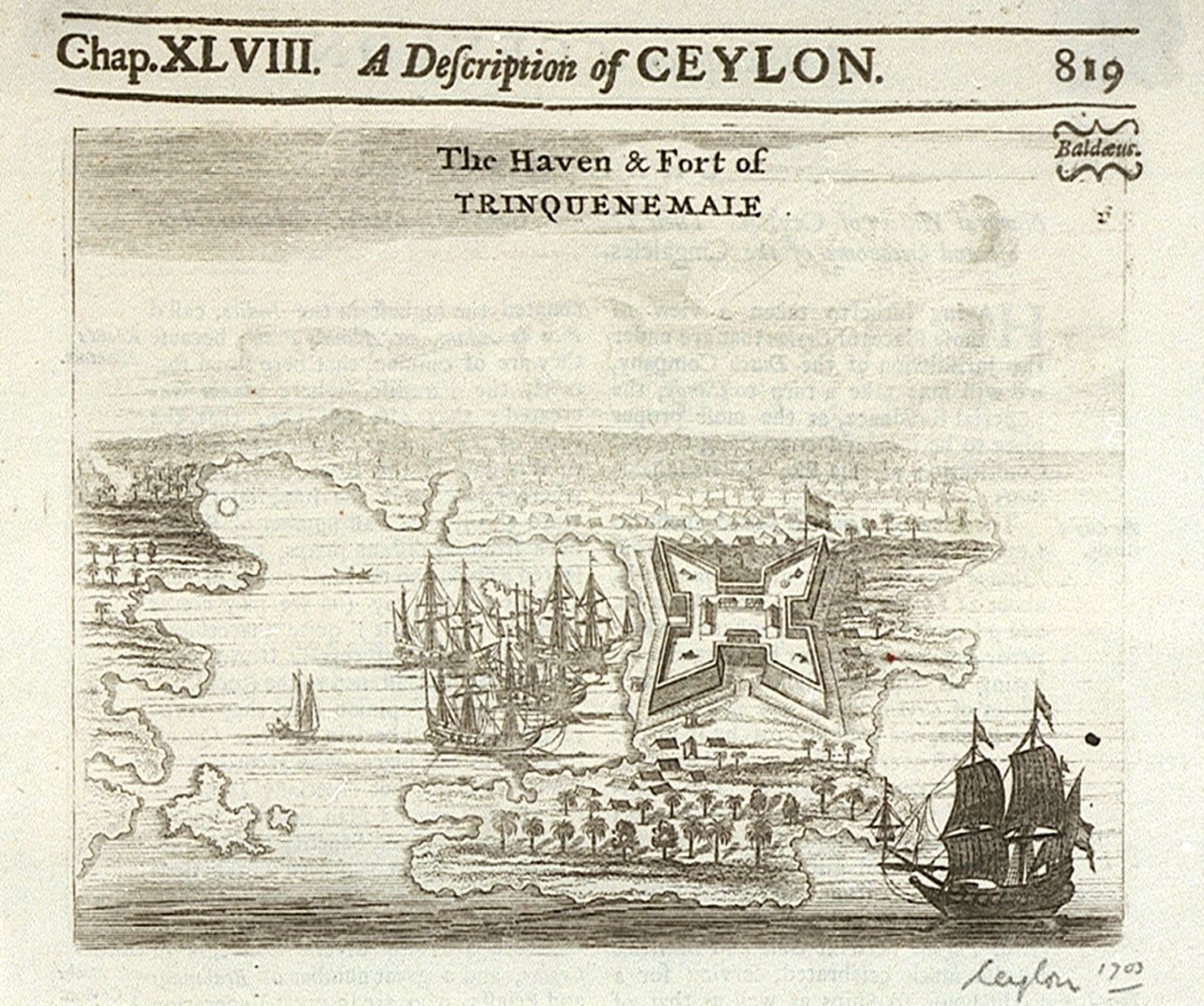
The fort in 1606

Several Hindu shrines in the Tamil country were destroyed during the occupation, particularly under Philip II, when Trincomalee became the scene of naval battles during Europe's Thirty Years' War. King Ethirimana Cinkam of the Jaffna kingdom had resisted a call by D. Jerónimo de Azevedo in 1612 to aid the latter in building a fortress in Trincomalee. The enterprise was abandoned. With the defeat of King Cankili II, all of the territory of the kingdom of Jaffna, comprising Trincomalee and Batticaloa, was assigned to the "spiritual cures of the Franciscans." This decision was taken by the bishop of Cochin, fray Dom Sebastião de S. Pedro. By the end of 1619, a small Danish fleet had arrived at Trincomalee; in May 1620, the Danes occupied Koneswaram temple and began works for the fortification of the peninsula before being defeated.

=== 1622 destruction of Koneswaram temple ===
The shrine was attacked and destroyed on April 14, 1622, CE, the Tamil New Years Day, by the Portuguese general Constantino de Sá de Noronha (who called it the Temple of a Thousand Pillars). The main statue was taken out to town during the 'ther' (chariot or car) procession, during which time Portuguese soldiers entered the temple dressed as Iyer priests and began robbing it. In an act of religious zeal, the temple was then levered over the edge into the sea. Fleeing priests buried some of the temple's statues in the surrounding area. Temple stones and its carved pillars were used to construct Fort Fredrick to strengthen the colonists' influence over the eastern seaboard of the island against other invading European armies, including the Dutch navy during the Dutch–Portuguese Wars. An extensive campaign of destruction of five hundred Hindu shrines, the Saraswathi Mahal Library and forced conversion in the Tamil country was conducted by the Portuguese upon their arrival to the island and conquest of the Jaffna kingdom; the temple had been paying protection fees of 1280 fanams a year to the Portuguese. Trincomalee witnessed several naval battles of Europe's Thirty Years' War under Phillip II's man Filipe de Oliveira. Between 1639 and 1689 CE, the Ati Konanayakar temple was built in nearby Thampalakamam to house the idols on procession that survived. The destruction of the Konesar temple is historically viewed as the biggest loot of one of the richest temples of Asia. Gold, pearls, precious stones and silks collected for more than 1000 years were robbed within a few hours. A site plan by De Queiroz states: "On the first rise to the summit of the rock was a Pagoda, another at mid-ascent, and the principal one of them all at the highest eminence, visited by a concourse of Hindus from the whole of India." In his dispatch to Philip III, King of Portugal, Constantino described: "The land of the Pagoda is 600 fathoms long and 80 feet at its broadest, narrowing to 30 feet." The final monument of the temple complex was destroyed two years later. Regarding a prophetic Tamil inscription de Noronha found at the site, he added "When I went there to make this Fort, I found engraved on the Pagoda, among many other inscriptions, one that ran thus: Kulakottan has built this pagoda..."

=== 1624 - 1639 ===
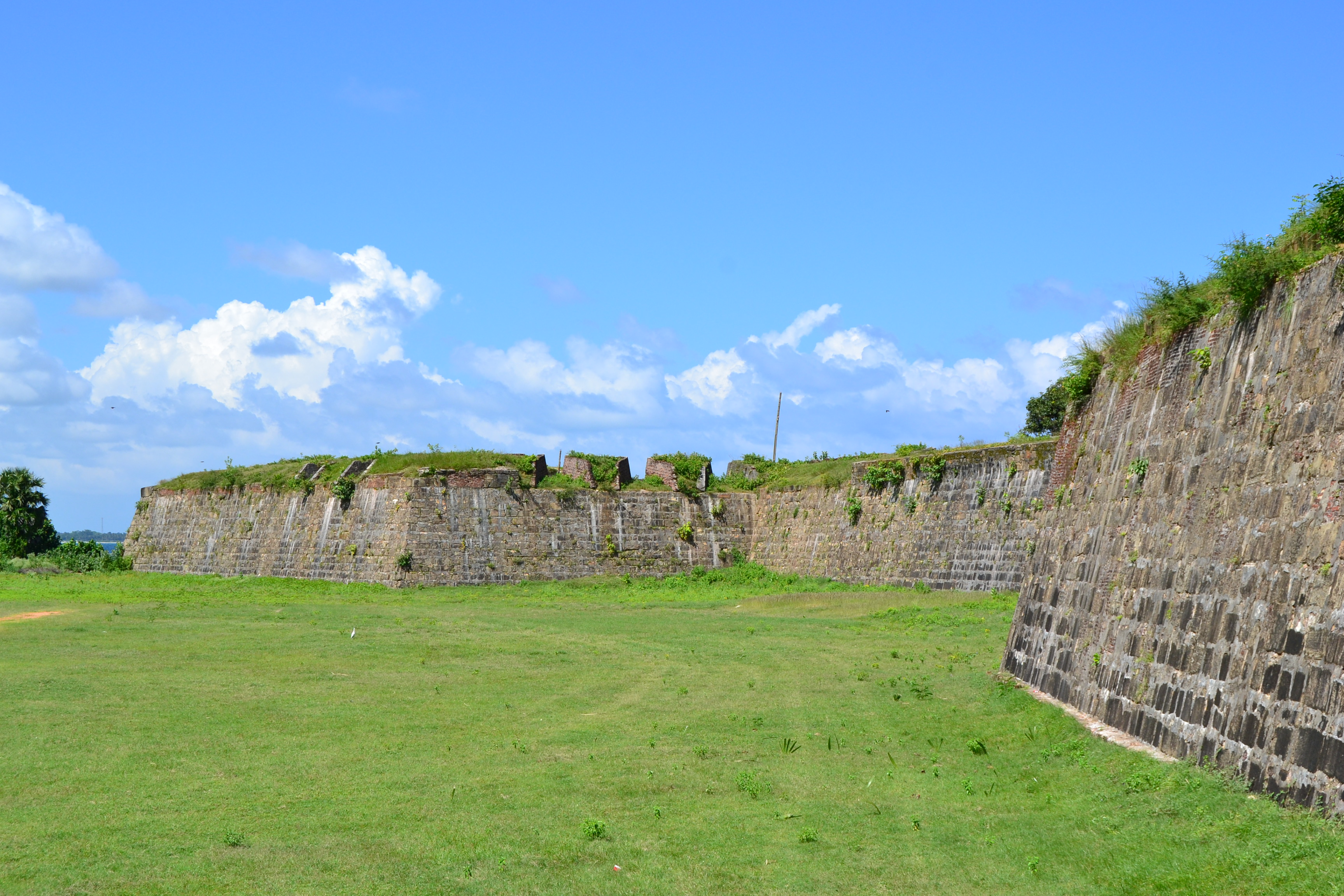
Fort Fredrick.

The fort that was built by the Portuguese was initially a triangular fort named the Fort of Triquillimale by the Portuguese equipped with guns captured from a Danish fleet ship. Of triangular shape it was "... of stone and mortar..." with three bastions to the three angles, the more important bastion, was called ‘Santa Cruz’, it was the key for the defence of the bay and it was situated on the south side of the isthmus to directed contact with the waters of the bay, on this bastion were mounted six pieces of artillery. To the north extremity of the isthmus was situated the bastion of ‘Santo António’, it was equipped of five pieces of artillery. The two main bastions were connect by a wall 100 "paços" long, three and half "braças" high and six "palmos" thick, this wall closed the isthmus in its more narrow part. A third bastion, the smallest of the three, was situated on the north side up on the peninsula, on this bastion were mounted three pieces of artillery. All the artillery had been recovered by a relict of a Danish ship. Another wall of the same dimension of the previous one, connected on the south side this third bastion with the main bastion of ‘Santa Cruz’. While on the north side the third bastion was connected with that of Sancto Antonio only by a parapet of "pedra and cal" situated on the top of the rock cliff to the sea, the Portuguese had modified the escarpment below this wall so as to render it steeper. On the higher extremity of the peninsula a small settlement of Portuguese ‘casados’ and indigenous was situated, in total ‘vinte brancos e vinte e cinco pretos’. The casados together with 50 Portuguese soldiers guaranteed the garrisoning of the fortress. The soldiers resided inside of the fortress together with their captain, while the captain of the fort that was named by the King or by the Viceroy, resided in a house in the settlement of the casados.18 In accordance with a map in the "Livro das plantas das fortalezas cidades e povoaçois do Estado da India Oriental" another isolated bastion was present on the south side of the rocky promontory. In front of the two main bastions a ditch seems to have been present. A small native village was situated between the Portuguese fort and the bay. In the Bocarro's map are shown also three temples on the extreme point of the peninsula, these temples instead are not present in the map of the "Livro das plantas das fortalezas cidades and povoaçois do Estado da India Oriental" of the library of the Paço Ducal de Vila Viçosa. The entrance of the fort seems to have been situated along the southern wall on the side of the village of ‘casados’.

A map of the Portuguese age, compiled by the same Costantino de Sá governor of Ceylon, shows the fort of Trincomalee situated on the isthmus of the peninsula, clearly indicated in it is the village of the casados situated on the peninsula beyond the fort, the same fort has triangular shape with three bastions. It makes part of the same collection, a greater map of the fort, entitled "Planta da fortalesa de Trinquilimale" with indicates the names of the three bastions: S. Cruz (the larger bastion), S. António and the small S. Tiago, with the indication "este baluarte se acomodou ao sitio". On the inner inside of the fort it is the name of N. S. de Guadalupe, indicating the name of the church of Trincomalee. Costantino de Sá informs us that on the three bastions were mounts 16 pieces of artillery, the garrison comprised 40 soldiers and 30 casados. The place was judged by de Sá impregnable for being placed on high cliffs and, according with his opinion, also the Portuguese city with a few works of fortification could be rendered one of the more strong places of the entire east.19 This is the description that captain João Ribeiro makes to us of the fort of Trincomalee: the fort was a triangular fortress with three bastions, one on each angle, armed with 10 iron guns, it was constructed on a hill near the ‘Bay dos Arcos’, inside the fort was a church20 and a warehouse for the goods and ammunitions. A captain and 50 soldiers were of garrison, in the fortress then resided a constable, Casados and a chaplain. The dimensions of smaller sides of the fortress were of 75 meters, the greater side measured 150 meters.

=== 1639 - present ===
This fort was captured by a Dutch fleet under Antonie Caan in 1639 and in 1665 a new fort was built here by the Dutch to defend against the advancements of the British and the French. In 1672, the year when the Dutch Republic was attacked by France, Britain, and two German states, the French tried to establish a base for the French East-India Company in nearby Kottiyar Bay, but they were soon forced to leave. Trincomalee was important for its large all-season secure harbor. In late 18th century Trincomalee traded hands once more with the British capturing it during the Fourth Anglo-Dutch War, the French taking it from the British and handing it back to the Dutch East India Company (VOC) at the Peace of Paris in 1784. In 1795, when the French had occupied the Dutch Republic during the War of the First Coalition, it was again taken over by the British, who renamed it Fort Fredrick. It remained a British garrison till 1948. Duri Coastal artillery guns were added during the two World Wars. Today it remains garrisoned by a detachment of the Gajaba Regiment, Sri Lanka Army, but accessible to visitors.

Arthur Wellesley, later 1st Duke of Wellington visited whilst a Colonel in the British East India Company, the bungalow he resided in is known as Wellesley Lodge which is inside Fort Fredrick and now is the officer's mess of the 2nd (Volunteer) battalion of the Gajaba Regiment of the Sri Lankan Army.

== See also ==
- Forts of Sri Lanka
