= Meenavar =

Caste

Meenavar is the Tamil name for fishermen, and is a term applied to the various fishing communities in Tamil Nadu, India such as the Paravars of the southeast coast, Sembadavars of the inland regions and Pattanavars of the central and northern coast.
