= Karaiyar =

Maritime martial Tamil caste from Sri Lanka

- Religions: Hinduism, Christianity
- Languages: Tamil
- Subdivisions: Meelongi Karaiyar; Keelongi Karaiyar
- Related groups: Tamil people, Karava, Pattanavar

Karaiyar is a Sri Lankan Tamil caste found mainly on the northern and eastern coastal areas of Sri Lanka, and globally among the Tamil diaspora.

They are traditionally a seafaring community that is engaged in fishing, shipment and seaborne trade. They fish customarily in deep seas or on shore, and employ gillnet and seine fishing methods. The Karaiyars were the major maritime traders and boat owners who among other things, traded with pearls, chanks, tobacco, and shipped goods overseas to countries such as India, Myanmar and Indonesia. The community known for their maritime history, are also reputed as a warrior caste who contributed as army and navy soldiers of Tamil kings. They were noted as the army generals and navy captains of the Aryacakravarti dynasty.

The Karaiyars emerged in the 1980s as strong representatives of Sri Lankan Tamil nationalism. The nuclear leadership of the Liberation Tigers of Tamil Eelam have background in the wealthier enterprising section of the Karaiyars. Vellupillai Prabhakaran was of Melongi Karaiyar origin.

Historically, they have also been referred to as Kurukulam, Varunakulam and Karaiyalar. Sharing similar origins and status are the Sinhalese Karava and the Pattanavar of Tamil Nadu.

== Etymology ==
The word "Karaiyar" is derived from the Tamil language word karai ("coast" or "shore") and attaches the honorific suffix -ar ("people"). The term Kareoi mentioned by 2nd century AD writer Ptolemy, is identified with the Tamil word "Karaiyar". Other English, Portuguese and Dutch sources mentions them variously as Karaiar, Karayar, Careas, Careaz, and Carias.

Kurukulam, Varunakulam and Arasakulam were historically one of the significant clans of the Karaiyars. Kurukulam, meaning "clan of the Kuru", may be a reference to their origin from Kurumandalam (meaning "realm of Kuru's") of Southern India. They attribute their origin myth from the Kuru kingdom, mentioned in Hindu epic Mahabharata. Some scholars derived Kurukulam from Kuru, the Tamil name for Jupiter. Varunakulam, meaning "clan of Varuna", is a reference to their maritime origin. Varuna is the god of sea and rain, mentioned in Vedic Literature, but also in Sangam literature as the principal deity of the Neithal Sangam landscape (i.e. littoral landscape). Arasakulam means "clan of kings".

== History ==
=== Ancient era ===
The Karaiyar, are among the old coastal communities who inhabited the Neithal Sangam landscape. The ancient Tamil literature mentions several coastal populations, but does not contain any direct references to the Karaiyars.

Migration of Karaiyars from South India to Sri Lanka started from around second century BCE. The earliest reference to them could be the 1st century BCE Tamil Householders Terrace, Pali inscription in Anuradhapura referring to several Tamil chiefs including one named "Dameda navika Karava", translated as "Tamil Karayar sailor". The Purananuru mentions "Karaiyavar", but not as a coastal population; in the later literature, the word came to be identified with coastal people.

=== Medieval era ===
Several inscriptions mention high-ranked military officials under the title Kurukulattaraiyan (meaning "King of Kurukulam"). An inscription in Tirumukkudal, Tamil Nadu mentions a notability named Kurukulattaraiyan who 'wore a golden anklet' as the commander of the army of Vijayabahu I (11th century AD) who ended the Chola rule in Sri Lanka. Another Kurukulattaraiyan, Choran Uyyaninraduvan, the minister of Maravarman Sundara Pandyan (13th century AD) is mentioned as gifting land and making offerings for the Ninra Narayana Perumal temple in an epigraphy of the temple. The same minister is also mentioned in an inscription issued by Jatavarman Kulasekaran I.

According to an account given in the Mukkara Hatana manuscript, a battalion of 7740 Karaiyar soldiers came from Kurumandalam in Southern India, and defeated the Mukkuvars (another coastal community) and Sonakars (Tamil Muslims). The Yalpana Vaipava Malai states that Parakramabahu VI of Kotte invited Karaiyar battalions to facilitate trade with other countries. The Karaiyars also formed alliances with coastal military castes from Tamil Nadu such as the Maravars. The Maravars who had strong influence in Northern Sri Lanka, established themselves as trading and sea lords and assimilated into the Karaiyar caste. A 13th century inscription of Maravarman Kulasekara Pandyan I in Tharangambadi, Tamil Nadu makes a reference to the Karaiyars along with the mercantile guild Patinenvisayattar making food offerings to the Masilamaninathar temple.

The Vaiya Padal mentions the voyage of a Karaiyar chief known as Meekāman, who traveled with ships loaded with several castes and chiefs, including the Karaiyars who make reference as Varunakulaththar. Another Karaiyar chief also known as Meekāman is credited for leading a troop of Chola soldiers and defeating the powerful Mukkuvar chiefs Vediarasan and Meera. According to one version was this strife caused because of a Pandya ruler who sent Meekaman to obtain a Naga gemstone for Kannagi (the heroine of Silappatikaram). A destroyed fort at Neduntheevu, the Delft Island fort is locally known as Meekaman kōttai, and is thought to have been the fort of Meekaman. According to Mattakallappu Manmiyam, Kalinga Magha (founder of Aryacakravarti dynasty) gave the principality of Mannar to those of the Kurukulam lineage.

The Karaiyars in alliance with the Paravars were in control of the port-based trade and the pearl fishery conducted in the Gulf of Mannar under the Jaffna Kingdom, which were one of the worlds major pearl fisheries.

=== Colonial era ===
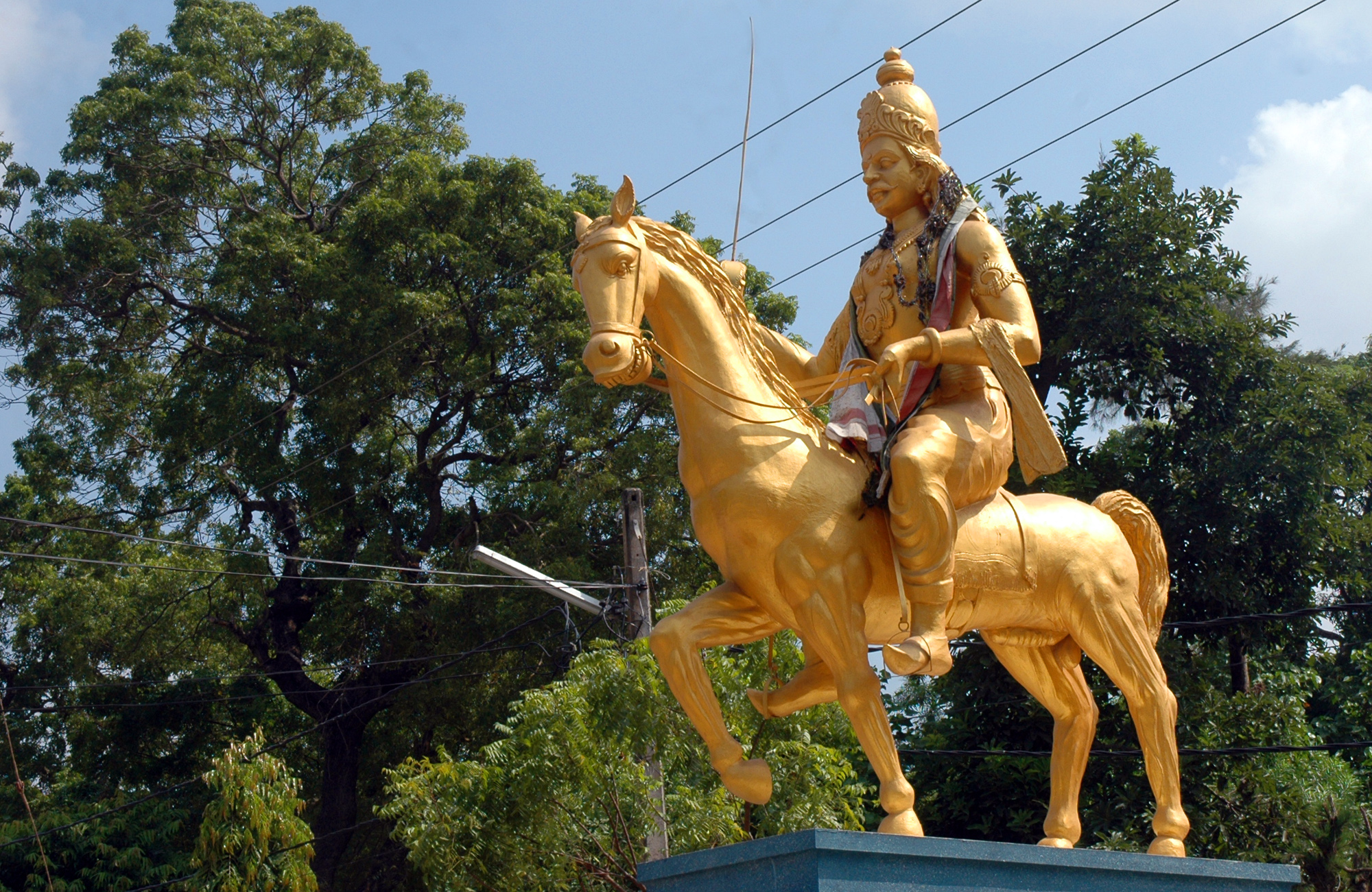
Statue of king Cankili II in Jaffna

The Karaiyars were by the Portuguese described as the most "warlike" tribe and their chiefs as most serious adversaries of the colonial Portuguese. The Karaiyars revolted six times against the Portuguese in the conquest of the Jaffna kingdom, who aligned and also commanded over the troops of Thanjavur Nayak Kingdom, whose king was Raghunatha Nayak. The first revolt led by a Karaiyar chieftain who was defeated near Nallur by Phillippe de Oliveira and his army.

The second revolt against them was led by the Karaiyar chief Migapulle Arachchi, a feudal lord of Jaffna Kingdom who also led the third revolt. A later revolt was started by the Karaiyars and the Thanjavur Nayak troops of over 5000 men, commanded by the Karaiyar chief, Varunakulattan, one described by the Portuguese as being of kingly status.

The Portuguese ordered Cankili II, king of Jaffna Kingdom, to surrender the Thanjavur Nayak soldiers and Varunakulattan (who is described as "King of Careas"). However Cankili II did not surrender them as they had come on his request, and were later on defeated by the Portuguese. Upon defeat were significant numbers of Karaiyars along with the Nairs and Karavas appointed as Lascarins under Portuguese rule, and were converted to Catholicism. In the Jaffna region, the Karaiyars were a dominant caste and were considered as upper-class in the social hierarchy, where conversion to Christianity of sections of them allowed them to grow closer to the Portuguese in power.

After the expulsion of the Portuguese, was the growing Dutch rule revolted in 1658 in the Jaffna region by the Christian Karaiyars and Madapallis. A Dutch minister of the 17th century, Philippus Baldaeus, described the Karaiyars, Madapallis and Vellalars among the influential classes of the Christians. Elite Karaiyars were appointed to the rank of Mudaliyars. The Karaiyar dominance got weakened through the political rise of the Vellalars under Dutch rule.

For centuries have the Karaiyars had sea-trade relations with India but also Myanmar, Thailand, Malaysia and Indonesia, which has been heavily restricted since British rule.

=== Modern era ===
In the 20th century, the Karaiyar were the second largest group of voters among the Sri Lankan Tamils after the Vellalar. The Karaiyars formed around 10% of the population, while the dominant Vellalars constituted about 50% of the population. The Karaiyars dominated the political scene of the Tamils in the late 20th century through the liberation struggle for an independent Tamil Eelam state for Tamils as a result of government sponsored riots and acts such as the 1958 anti-Tamil pogrom and the Standardisation act. Educated Karaiyar youths from Jaffna Peninsula took to militancy as means of protest and formed separatist groups such as TELO, EROS, EPRLF and the world renowned LTTE, also widely known as the Tamil Tigers.

That the core leadership of the LTTE had Karaiyar origin, (e.g. the leader of the LTTE, Velupillai Prabhakaran was a Melongi Karaiyar), enabled them to develop a strong Sea Tiger force due to their traditional knowledge on seafaring and the waterways of the Palk Strait. They benefited greatly from their kinship and long trade relation with the seafaring and militant communities of the Coromandel Coast, enabling them to set up training camps in coastal regions of Tamil Nadu and exploit the sea for weapon smuggling. Through their kinship to the Karaiyar landlord class in Batticaloa region, the LTTE also gained recruitment of Eastern Tamils. Although having a significant Karaiyar representation, the LTTE promoted Tamil unity through anti-casteism and recruited without caste and regional distinctions, and thus ensured them to be the representative of the Tamil society as a whole compared to the other Tamil militant groups.

== Customs ==
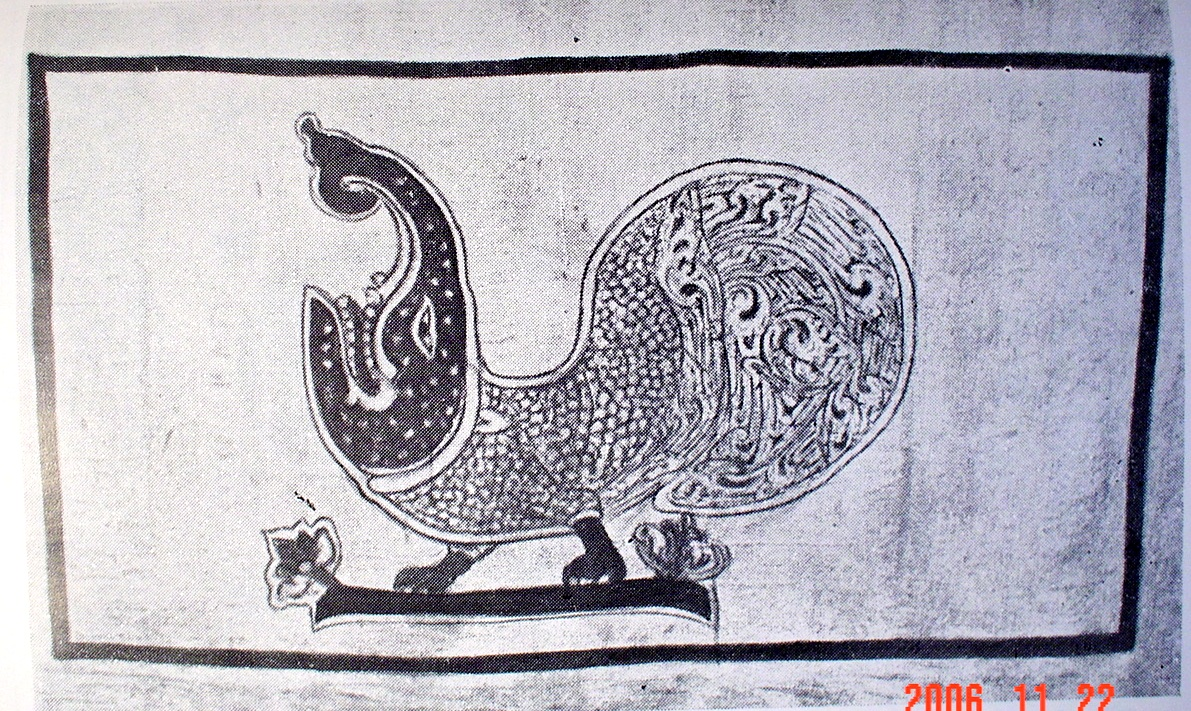
The Makara flag of the Karaiyars

The Karaiyars were assigned the western section (present day Gurunagar) and the harbors of the Jaffna Kingdom. The Karaiyars formed the generals of the Jaffna kings and officered the navy of the Aryacakravarti dynasty. They used the Makara as emblem, the mount of their clan deity, the sea god Varuna, which was also seen on their flags. Kannaki Amman is one of the chief deities of the Hindu Karaiyars, whereas Francis Xavier and the Virgin Mary are among the chief saints of the Christian Karaiyars.

The Karaiyars in Northern Sri Lanka are classified into two groups: the Meelongi and the Keelongi. (Note: Excerpt about the Karaiyar subcastes, from Merchants, markets and the state in early modern India: The karaiyar had a less sharp distinction between melongi (i.e. those who aim high) and kilongi (those who aim low).) The Melongi Karaiyars are some areas known as Thevar Karaiyar and Kurukula Karaiyar, who were descendants of commanders, while Keelongi Karaiyars were descendants of the army's soldiers and workers. The Karaiyars in Eastern Sri Lanka like other castes are divided into kudi's or matrilineal clans. The Eastern Karaiyars almost exclusively also use the term Vaiyittu Var (Tamil for "womb-tie") as a synonymous term for kudi or clan.

The chieftains and village headmen of the Karaiyars held the title Pattankattiyar, meaning "One who is crowned" in Tamil. Other titles they used were Adappanar, Mudaliar, Pillai, Kurukulattan and Varunakulattan. The Adappans along with the Pattankattiyar were headmen who were responsible of the harbors and pearl fishery of the northern and western parts of Sri Lanka. At the hand of the powerful maritime trading clans of the Karaiyars, the emergence of urban centers known as pattanam were seen. Pattanavar (literally meaning "pattanam-residents"), is an almost extinct caste name also used by the Karaiyars. Mudaliar (meaning "capitalist") were conferred on the maritime elite trading clans of the Karaiyars as titles of nobility.

The domestic servants of the Karaiyars, who are known as Kudimakkal include the castes of Ambattar, Vannar, Maraiyar and Nattuvar. They gave importance in their ritual roles as officiators under the wedding and funeral.

== See also ==
- Caste system in Sri Lanka
- Portuguese conquest of the Jaffna kingdom
