= Pattanavar =

Tamil caste found in Indian state Tamil Nadu

- Religions: Hinduism, Christianity
- Languages: Tamil
- Subdivisions: Periya Pattanavar; Chinna Pattanavar; Karaiyar; Padaiyachi
- Related groups: Tamil people, Karaiyar, Karava

Pattanavar (also spelled Pattinavar) is a Tamil caste found in Tamil Nadu, India.

They are a maritime community dominating Chennai, Kanchipuram, Cuddalore, Villuppuram, Thanjavur and Nagapattinam districts of the Coromandel Coast, who have traditionally been involved in fishing, shipment, navy, and trade.

== Etymology ==
The term Pattanavar literally means inhabitant of a Pattinam. The term Pattinam means "sea-port town" which is often seen as a suffix among prominent harbors such as Nagapattinam, Kaveripoompattinam and Chennaipattinam. They are among other divided as Periya Pattanavar and Chinna Pattanavar. The term Periya means "big" and the term Chinna means "small", where the Periya Pattanavar are considered socially superior to the Chinna Pattanavar.

The Pattanavars are also colloquially known as Karaiyar in the Thanjavur district, which is also the term of one of the sub-caste of the community. Karaiyar means "coast people", which is also term for a dominant maritime caste in Sri Lanka. The earliest mention of this term is made by 2nd century AD Greek writer Ptolemy, mentioning them with the corrupted term Kareois. The subcaste's name Padaiyachi means literally "ruler of army".

== History ==
The Pattanavar are one of the communities who traditionally inhabited the Sangam landscape Neithal, the littoral landscape. They have inhabited the Coromandel Coast since ancient times where they possess a strong system of self-governance.

The Pattinavar merchants were organized in trader guilds such as the Five Hundred Lords of Ayyavolu and the Patinenvisayattar. They were reputed for oversea trading with other South Asian countries. The Pattinavars served additionally as naval mercenaries under the Tamil kings. According to some historians like Hermann Kulke, the Pattinavar community may have played a significant role in the organization and exploits of the Chola navy.

== Traditions ==
=== Governing systems ===
The Pattanavar possess a strong system of self-governance. Their Panchayati raj is controlled by their hereditary leaders known as Nattar.

The Pattanavar follow a traditional system known as Padu. The term Padu means "fishing ground" or "fishing site". According to Matthew, the Padu system is a "traditional system of granting entitlements to eligible members of a particular community to undertake specific fishing activities in certain designated fishing grounds during specified seasons." The system is hereditary where only those of the Periya Pattanavar subcaste can participate. The participants are granted the rights to use padu fishing gears which include beach seine and stake net. Fishing with gears unregulated by the Padu system are often methods of low yields.

== Subcastes ==
The Pattanavar are traditionally divided into endogamous subcastes which include the Periya Pattanavar, Chinna Pattanavar, Karaiyar and Padaiyachi. Both Karaiyar and Padaiyachi are traditionally considered subcastes of warrior heritage. The Periya Pattanavar and the Chinna Pattanavar are said to share common ancestor.

== Titles ==
They use titles such as Chetty, Mudaliar, Pillai, Varunakula Mudali and Kurukulavamsam. Their headmen were known as Yejaman and Nattamai. The title Chetty, is a generic term used by several Tamil merchant groups. The Pattanavars who used this title had politicoeconomic power, and gained wealth through maritime trade. Their village headmen were also known as Ūr Chettiar, where the main headman was known as Periya Chettiar and the assistant headman known as Chinna Chettiar.

The Pattanavar have also been noted to have caste titles such as Varunakula mudali (Varuna clan headman) or Kurukula vamsam (Kuru clan lineage). These titles are also shared with the Sinhalese Karava and Sri Lankan Tamil Karaiyar who share common origins.

== See also ==
- Coastline of Tamil Nadu
- Timeline of the Kurukulam
- Sembadavar
