= Migapulle Arachchi =

Feudal lord from the Jaffna Kingdom

Migapulle Arachchi was a feudal lord from the Jaffna Kingdom who became a rebel leader just after its annexation by the Portuguese Empire in 1619. His title Arachchi, is a title given to the commanders of Lascarins or native military forces.

== Name ==
He is also known by other names including Ciṉṉa Mikkappiḷḷai or Ciṉṉa Mīkāppiḷḷai also known as Chinna Migapillai.

== Life ==
=== Revolt against Cankili II ===
After the death of Ethirimana Cinkam, the king of Jaffna Kingdom, there were three claimants to the throne. Cankili II usurped the throne by killing the other claimants, Arasakasari the latter king's brother and Periyapillai Arachchi a powerful Karaiyar chieftain and father of Migapulle. Migapulle fled to Mannar with the two princesses of Jaffna kingdom to the Portuguese and embraced Catholic Christianity, and was baptised as Dom Luis. Migapulle joined other Christian mudaliyars such as Dom Pedro and with other local support who were dissatisfied with the cruel rule of Cankili and rose to revolt. Cankili put down the uprising by inviting Raghunatha Nayak, who sent his captain Varunakulattan (also known as Khem Nayak) and a force of 5000 men. Cankili II was under the Portuguese made the governor of Jaffna in 1617 and paid tribute to them on the promise that he had no contact with the Karaiyar captains.

=== Resistance to Portuguese rule ===
The Portuguese conquered the Jaffna kingdom in 1619 and sent Cankili II to Goa where he was beheaded. Six revolts were led by Karaiyar captains between 1620 and 1621. Migapulle went to India and invited Raghunatha Nayak on March 1620, the king of Thanjavur Nayak kingdom. They were eventually defeated by the Portuguese and a second rebellion was led by Varunakulattan, under the support of the Thanjavur Nayak. They were finally defeated in February 1621 by Phillippe de Oliveira. The rebellion was put down with excessive brutality against the civilian population including mass murder and mutilations.
