= Sangiliyan Statue =

- சங்கிலியன் சிலை
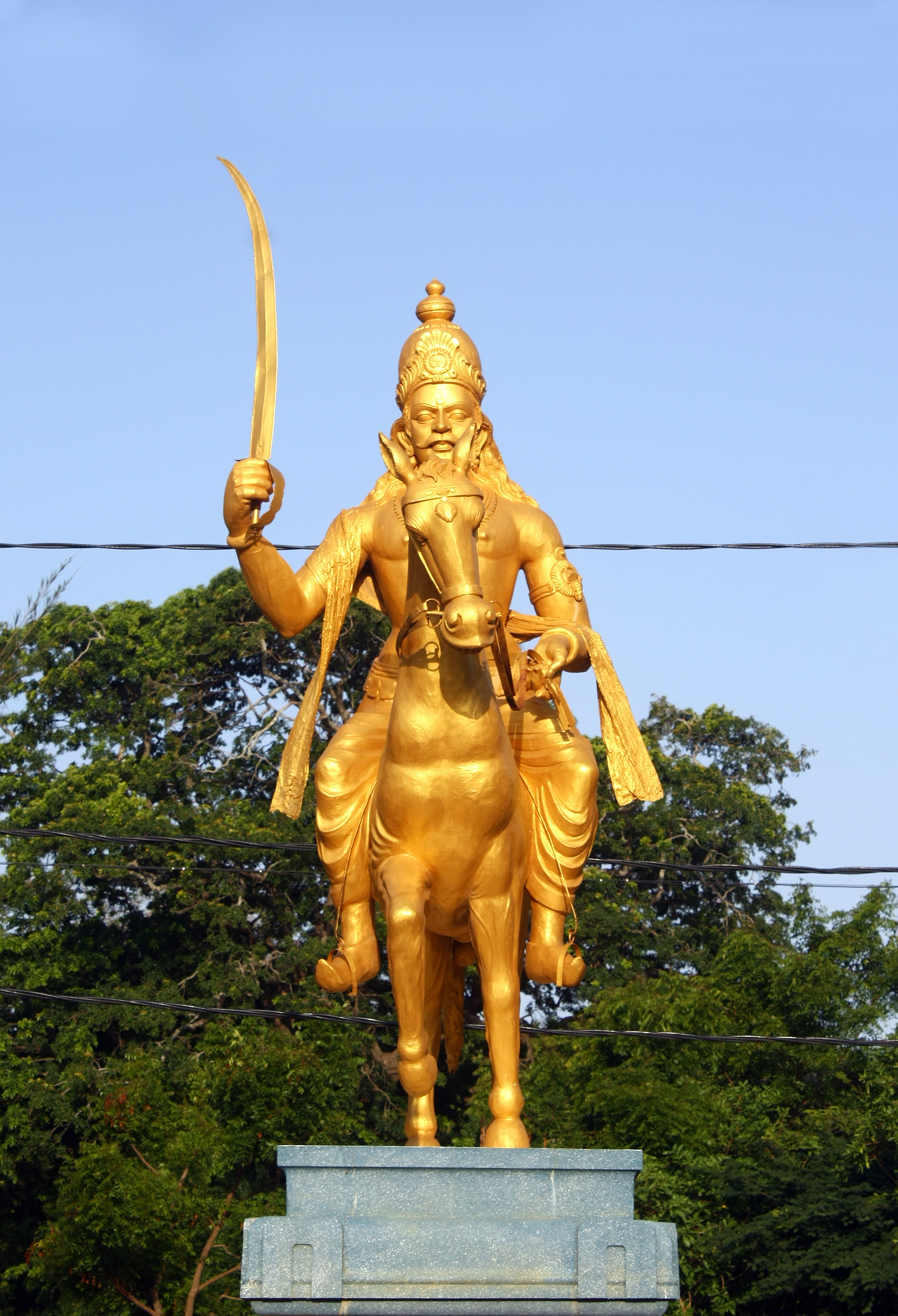
- Location: Muthirai Junction, Jaffna, Sri Lanka
- Type: Equestrian statue
- Material: 1500 bricks and 10 packets of cement
- Completion date: 1974, rebuilt 2011
- Dedicated to: Cankili II

The Sangiliyan statue was dedicated to Cankili II, a Tamil martyr and the last king of Jaffna Kingdom. The statue is seen as a landmark of the city of Jaffna. The Sangiliyan statue was built 1974 at Muthirai junction Nallur and declared open by then Jaffna Mayor Alfred Duraiappah. On 2011 was the statue removed and a new statue was built at the same place. The new statue was declared open by Jaffna Mayor Mrs. Yogeshwarai Patkunarajah and Minister Douglas Devananda. Tamil groups believe the statue was destroyed and rebuilt because of political motives. They criticize by this act was the historic beauty of the statue destroyed, the new statue has not the heroic features of the former statue, the sword in the hand of Cankili was removed by the government and reinstalled in another position.

== Differences ==
=== Old one ===
Sangiliyan Statue

=== New one ===
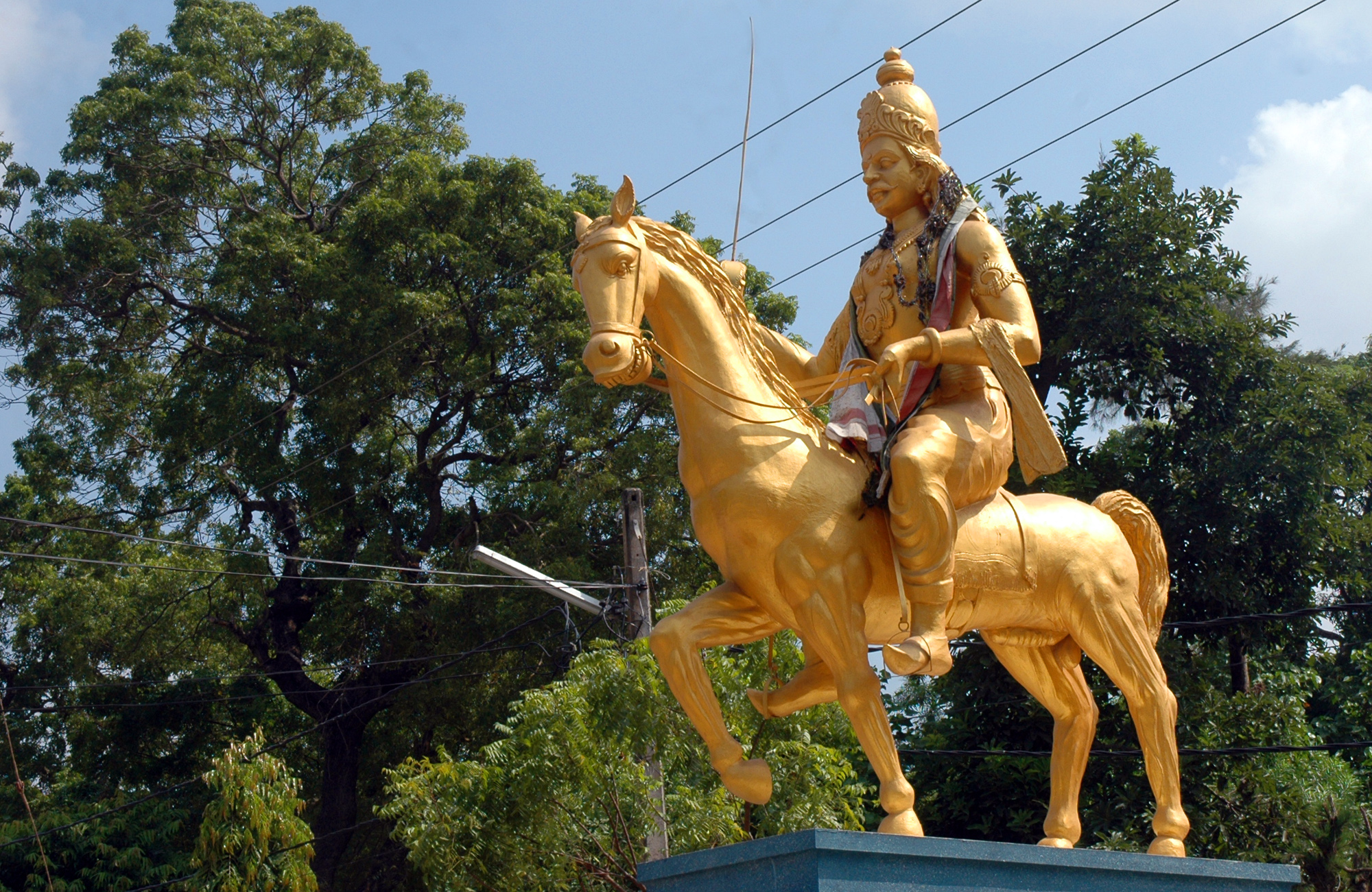

== See also ==
- List of equestrian statues
