= Varunakulattan =

17th c. lord in the Jaffna Kingdom

Varunakulattan (also identified as Khem Nayak or Chem Nayak) was a 17th-century general of Tanjore nayak, feudal lord and military commander from the Tanjore Nayak Kingdom. He led a rebellion as the military commander of Thanjavur Nayak against the Portuguese in their conquest of the Jaffna kingdom in 1619. Although the nominal king was Cankili II, Varunakulattan was described as the king of Karaiyars, and wield the real power in the Jaffna Peninsula.

== Origin theories ==
Varunakulattan is known in various letters under names such as Varunakulattan, Chem Nayak and "the King of Careas" as pointed out by scholars such as Chandra de Silva and Rev. Gnanaparakasar. The name "Varuna Kulattan" means "he of the clan of Varuna". Varuna is the sea god of the Neydal Sangam landscape and the totem of the Karaiyars (maritime martial caste).

== Life ==
=== First appearance ===
After the death of Jaffna king Ethirimana Cinkam, three men claimed the throne; Arasakesari the king's brother, Periya Pillai Arachchi a powerful Karaiyar chief and Cankili II the nephew of the king. Cankili II killed the other two triggering a local uprising against him. Migapulle Arachchi, the son of Periye Pillai Arachchi, with the aid of the Portuguese, raised a revolt against Cankili II and drove him to Kayts in August-September 1618. Cankili II sought help from Raghunatha Nayak, the king of Thanjavur Nayak. Raghunatha Nayak sent a troop of 5000 men under the command of Varunakulattan who put down the uprising.

=== Second appearance ===
The Portuguese hanged Cankili II in Goa and conquered the Jaffna Kingdom in 1619. Six revolts were led by Karaiyar chieftains from 1620-1621. After the failure of the first revolt in March 1620, the second failed revolt was led by Migapulle Arachchi with the aid of Prince of Rameswaram and one thousand Thanjavur Nayak soldiers who came with 12 dhonies. Migapulle Arachchi started a third revolt on 5 December 1620 with the aid of two thousand soldiers of Thanjavur Nayak kingdom under the command of Varunakulattan, again resulting in another defeat.

=== Third appearance ===
Varunakulattan led the fourth revolt. His new army landed in Achchuveli and was ambushed and destroyed by Portuguese admiral Antao da Motta Galvao and his force on 11 February 1621.
