= Nattar =

The institution of the nattar was well-defined. It was in charge of all matters pertaining to a village, including water-management. It was noted that: "If ruling class is taken to mean those with the power and authority to manage community resources, then the nattar was this class in Tamil country". Kallar sub-division was accorded the title of nattar.

== Description ==
Ceremonial establishments of brahmin villages in the nadus to pursue dharmic ends were important in effecting links beyond the nadu. The brahmadeyas of different nadus created a network of ritual specialists and in doing so fortified the standing of the nattar upon whose patronage this depended.

Nattar as a political body was recognized by the Pallavas and Pandyas. The Pallava and Pandya copper plates regarding grants of land had nattars mentioned in them.

== See also ==
- Ancient Tamil country
- Parvatha rajakulam
- Velirs
- Vellalar
