= Sembadavar =

- Religions: Hinduism, Roman Catholicism
- Languages: Tamil
- Related groups: Tamil people

Sembadavar or Parvatha Rajakulam is a traditional fisherman community found mainly on the Coromandel coast of the Indian state of Tamil Nadu and union territory of Pondicherry. They also take the title Nattar. Sembadavar are a maritime community who are occupied primarily as inland and river fishermen and primarily fish with fishing nets. Some Sembadavars migrated to Andhra Pradesh and Telangana to form a caste called Sambuni Reddi. There are many theories as to their origins but they have since ancient times been recorded in the area of Tamil Nadu, Pondicherry and Sri Lanka.

== Etymology ==
The name Sembadavar is mythologically connected to the principal Hindu god Shiva. The name is derived from the Tamil words Sambu, a name of Shiva and Padavar meaning boatmen thus literally meaning "Shiva's boatmen".

== History ==
=== Mythological origin ===
According to one legend, Shiva was fond of one of their chief deity Ankalamman. Out of the union was Parvatha Rajan (king of the Parvata Kingdom) born who disguised himself as a boatman. His boat was made of copper, the Vedas assumed the form of his fishing net and the Rakshasas took the form of the pisces. Accidentally was a rishi caught in his net, who angered called Parvatha Rajan a "Sembu Padavar" meaning "copper boatmen" and cursed his descendants to become fishermen. From this myth do they call themselves as Sembadavar or also Parvatha Rajakulam (meaning descendant of Parvatha Raja).

== Post-independence ==
In 1947, the fisheries became a monopoly of the new independent Indian government.

As of 2011, Parvatharajakulam is classified as a Most backward caste by the Governments of Tamil Nadu and Pondicherry.
