= Phillippe de Oliveira =

Portuguese administrator (died 1627)

Phillippe de Oliveira or Filipe de Oliveira (died 1627) was the conqueror of the Jaffna Kingdom in northern modern day Sri Lanka on behalf of the Portuguese Empire in 1619. He stayed behind as the captain-major of the conquered kingdom until his death in 1627. His instructions were to collect the tribute due from the last indigenous king of the Kingdom Cankili II but a chance encounter lead to a sharp but brief battle that led to the defeat of Cankili II. By his order, Cankili II was killed by hanging and Cankili's remaining soldiers were executed by decapitation. His rule over the Jaffna Kingdom is remembered both for the destruction of over 500 Hindu temples and the forced conversion of the natives to Catholicism as well as for his efforts in controlling and moderating the desire of colonial officials in Colombo and Goa to constantly increase taxes on the local population. After his death, the taxation policy followed by the Portuguese colonial rulers led to the de-population of the Jaffna Peninsula.
