= Jaffna Peninsula =

Region of Northern Province, Sri Lanka

Jaffna Peninsula: யாழ்ப்பாணக் குடாநாடு (Tamil); යාපනය අර්ධද්වීපය (Sinhala)
- Peninsula
- Location within Northern Province
- Coordinates: 9.686722°N 80.100632°E
- Location: Northern Province, Sri Lanka

The Jaffna Peninsula (Tamil: யாழ்ப்பாணக் குடாநாடு, romanized: Yāḻppāṇa kuṭānāṭu, or Tamil: யாழ் குடாநாடு, romanized: Yāḻ kuṭānāṭu) is a region in the Northern Province of Sri Lanka. It is home to the capital city of the province, Jaffna, and comprises much of the former land mass of the medieval Jaffna Kingdom.

The peninsula was historically divided into the three regions of Vadamarachchi, Thenmarachchi and Valikamam, which today make up three regions of the Jaffna District.

== History ==
=== Naga Nadu ===
Jaffna kingdom at its greatest extent c. 1350.

The Naga people were one of the ancient tribes of Sri Lanka, who were mainly concentrated in the Jaffna Peninsula. The peninsula was also known in pre-mediaeval era as Naga Nadu, which means "Land of the Nagas" as mentioned in the twin epics of ancient Tamilakam, the Silappatikaram and Manimekalai. The Pali chronicle Mahavamsa also refers to the peninsula with the corresponding name as Nagadipa, meaning "island of Nagas", where it is described as a Chiefdom with rulers named as Diparaja, meaning "King of Island". Ptolemy, the Greek writer from 100 AD refers to Nagadipoi as one of the coastal towns of Taprobana. Naga identity was visible through personal names which observed in Pali chronicles and the Tamil Sangam literature. Some scholars postulate that the Naga people were the ancestors of Tamil-speaking Dravidians.

=== Kingdom of Jaffna ===
In the 13th century, the Northern part of Sri Lanka including the Kingdom of Polonnaruwa was under the rule of Pandyan dynasty. Kulasekara Cinkaiariyan, a minister of the Pandyan dynasty, was installed as the king of peninsula. He was the first king of the Aryacakravarti dynasty. Under the rule of the Aryacakravarti kings, the Vannimai chieftains paid tribute to the Jaffna kings. The dynasty ruled the peninsula until 1619, after the last king Cankili II was killed under the Portuguese conquest of the Jaffna kingdom.

=== Colonial Rule ===
==== Dutch Colonial Rule ====
During the Dutch Colonial Rule, the regions were known as Walligamo (Valikamam), Patchelepalle (Vadamarachchi) and Temmorachie (Thenmarachchi).

=== 2004 Indian Ocean tsunami ===
The Northern and Eastern coasts of the peninsula were badly affected by tsunamis, especially by the 2004 Indian Ocean earthquake; this includes the villages on the Northern coast from Thondaimanaru to Thumpalai and the Eastern coast from Vallipuram to Kuddarappu. The damage to the eastern coast was higher than that of the northern coast. The fisheries sectors of this district were badly affected. Estimation of damages caused to different sectors has not been completed.

Available data revealed that a total of 2,640 people lost their lives while 1,647 were injured and 1,204 are missing. 37,255 people belonging to 9,885 families were displaced, of which 15,034 people belonging to 4,038 families are living in the welfare camps and the balance 22,221 people belonging to 5,847 families are living with their friends and relatives. People displaced from the coastal villages of Kankesanthurai, Myliddy and Palali due to the formation of heavy security zones are not yet settled in the above villages and are facing difficulties without homes and jobs. The fisheries and agriculture sectors in the above villages are affected badly and the Sri Lankan government has no plan to improve the living standards of these conflict-affected zones.

== Geography and climate ==
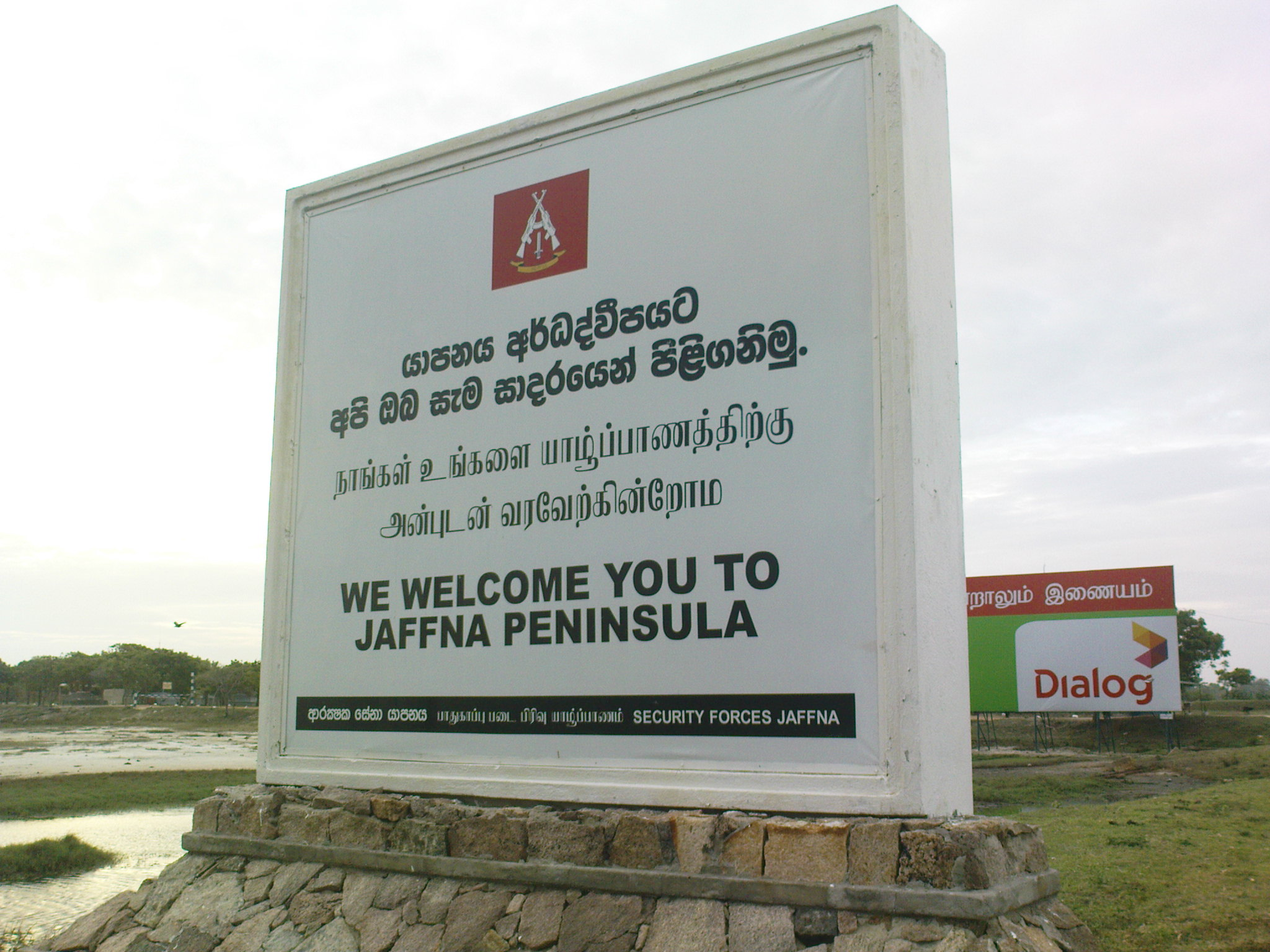
A sign seen at the entrance to Jaffna Peninsula.

Koppens classification AM. This type of climate, results from the monsoon winds which change direction according to the seasons. This climate has a driest month (which nearly always occurs at or soon after the "winter" solstice for that side of the equator) with rainfall less than 60 mm, but more than 1/25 the total annual precipitation

The climate of the Jaffna region is considered to be Tropical monsoonal AM with a seasonal rhythm of rainfall. The temperature ranges from 26 C to 33 C. Annual precipitation ranges from 696 mm to 1125 mm. It is evenly spread over the area. The northeast monsoon rain (October to January) accounts for more than 90% of the annual rainfall. The Jaffna Peninsula is divided into two agroecological regions. The peninsula is mostly surrounded by water, connected to the rest of the island by a small strip of land. Its underground water is used for drinking, agriculture and industry. Paddy cultivation is rain-fed but only for three months during the North East monsoon period. It is a part of the peninsula consisting of fourteen D.S Administrative Divisions. The total land area including inland water is 1,230 km². The terrain of the region is almost flat and of low elevation except in the central part of the western sector in the area around Tellippalai, where the elevation rises to 10.5 m above sea level. From there it slopes gently towards the south and southeast, while to the north the elevation tends to drop abruptly.

The soil found in Jaffna belongs to the following three major soil groups:

- Calcic Red-yellow latosols.
- Solodized solonetz and solon chaks.
- Regosols.

== Economy ==
=== Water sources ===
Water is extracted from open-dug wells for domestic and agricultural purposes. Approximately 28,000 wells serve both domestic and agricultural purposes. Water is available in these wells and its quality varies from place to place. In the majority of deep wells in the Valikamam division water is available for irrigation throughout the year. These wells are situated in the calcic red-yellow latosols and their depth varies from 20 to 25 feet (7.6 m). The wells available in other areas are shallow (10 to 15 ft).

=== Socioeconomic conditions ===
The total population of the district is around 600,000. Agriculture and fisheries have been the principal economic activities of the district. Over 60% of the workforce in the district depends on agriculture for their livelihood. About 86,000 families are engaged in agriculture while 15,000 families engage in fishing. Agriculture in the district contributes substantially to the GNP of the country. The land cultivated by 48% of the farmers does not belong to them. The average land holding area is around 0.5 to 0.75 acres (3,000 m^{2}). Unemployment in rural areas is 27.9% while in urban areas it is 25.8%.

=== Agriculture ===
The agriculture sector, including crop and livestock, has contributed around 65% of the total gross domestic product of the district. In terms of production, major cash crops like chili, onion, tobacco, potato and banana are produced in large extent to meet the substantial portion of the national requirement. Further fruit crops like mango, grapes and jack are also produced in large quantities.

Paddy

Total paddy land available for the cultivation is 12,000 ha. Of which nearly 8000 ha (64.6%) is being cultivated. About 2000 ha of paddy land is being identified as marginal due to the salinity problem. Paddy is cultivated as mono-crop in 85% of the paddy land and in the balance, 15% of paddy is followed by vegetable and field crops with the help of available irrigation. The average yield is about 50 bushels per acre (2.5 mt/ha). However, 30 40% of farmers who cultivate improved varieties are able to obtain a yield of 70 bushels per acre (3.5 mt/ha).

Vegetables

Vegetables are cultivated throughout the year with the help of irrigation from the dug wells. Low country vegetables such as brinjal, tomato, long bean, okra, snake gourd, bitter gourd and other leafy vegetables are being cultivated and available throughout the year. Exotic vegetables like cabbage, leeks, beet, beans, and carrots are also cultivated in large extent.

Field crops

Among the other field crops, onion, potato, tobacco, chili and banana are cultivated as cash crops because farmers obtain considerable income from these crops. The total extent of high land available for cultivation is 7,851 ha. Of which 1,642 ha (21%) is uncultivable due to security reasons. At present field crops and vegetables are cultivated in 4200 ha with the help of left irrigation from the dug wells.

Perennial Crops

Perennial crops include the orchard crops like mango, jack, grapes and citrus and other crops like palmyrah and coconut. Coconut is grown in the homestead in the extent of 1470 ha. Other perennial crops are grown in 1500 ha. Further, nearly 3.5 million palmyra palms are available in Jaffna. Farmers generate considerable income from fruit crops, like mango, jack, grapes etc. cultivated in 1850 ha. Grapes were cultivated in 380 ha during 1985 reduced to 55 ha in 2004.

=== Livestock ===
The livestock sector is an important component of the farming system. Up to 1950, only local cattle and goats were reared for milk and meat, With the establishment of artificial insemination in 1950 exotic cross breeds such as Jersey and Indian breeds of cattle were introduced and high milk yield was obtained. Further Jamunapari and Sannan breeds of goats were also introduced for meat and milk. With this introduction of new breeds, many farmers started rearing cross-breeds of cattle, goats and poultry. From 1950 to 1984 livestock enterprise developed very fast and it was a single or supplementary source of income for nearly 30% of the district population. Backyard poultry and rearing milking cows and goats for milk and meat generate additional income for the farmers. The livestock population reduced to a considerable extent during the last two decades due to the civil war.

== Bibliography ==
- Philippe Fabry, The Essential guide for Jaffna and its region, with Lisa Fabry-Bewley, Alexandra Fabry and Emmanuel Fabry, Negombo, Viator Publications, 2003, 159 p., ISBN 955-8736-01-5
