= Cankili II =

- King of Jaffna
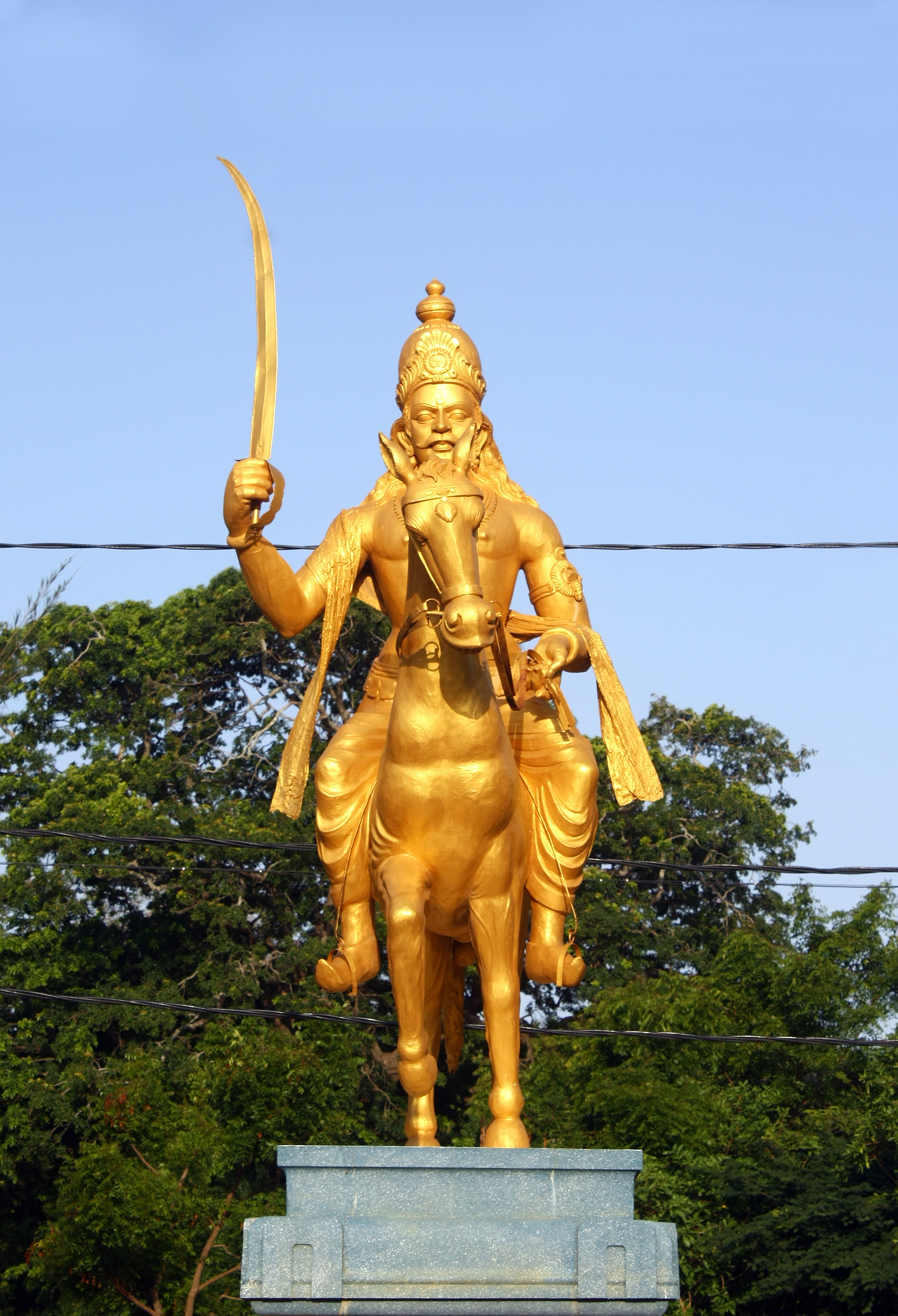
- King Sangiliyan Statue in Nallur, the capital of the Jaffna kingdom
- Reign: 1617–1619
- Predecessor: Ethirimana Cinkam (Parasasekaran VIII)
- Successor: Portuguese conquest
- Died: 1619
- Tamil: சங்கிலி குமாரன்
- Sinhala: සංකිලි
- House: Aryacakravarti dynasty

Cankili II (Tamil: சங்கிலி குமாரன், romanized: Caṅkili Kumāraṉ; reigned from 1617 - 1619), also spelled Sangili, was the last king of the Jaffna kingdom and was a usurper who came to throne with a palace massacre of the royal prince and the regent Arasa-kesari in 1617. His regency was rejected by the Portuguese colonials in Colombo, Sri Lanka. His reign was secured with military forces from the Thanjavur Nayaks and Karaiyar captains. He was defeated by the Portuguese in 1619 and was taken to Goa and beheaded. With his death the Aryacakravarti line of kings who had ruled the kingdom independently for over 300 years came to an end.

== Usurping the throne ==
With the death of Ethirimana Cinkam in 1617, there were three claimants to the throne. One was Cankili II, a nephew of the king. The other two claimants were the king's brother Arasakesari and a powerful chieftain Periye Pillai Arachchi. Ethirimana Cinkam's son, a minor was proclaimed as king with Arasakesari as regent. Cankili II killed the claimants to the throne and other princes of royal blood and usurped the throne.

Cankili II was King of Jaffna in 1617 and refused to pay tribute to portuguese on the promise that he had no contact with the Karaiyar captains.

== Local uprising ==
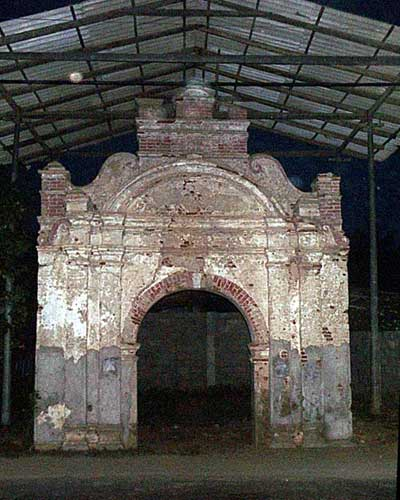
Cankilian Thoppu – Facade of the palace belonging to the last king Cankili II.

The palace massacre created unrest among the people of the Jaffna kingdom. Migapulle Arachchi, the son of Periye Pillai Arachchi, with the aid of the Portuguese drove Cankili to Kayts in August–September 1618. Cankili had to seek aid from Raghunatha Nayak, the king of Thanjavur Nayak kingdom, who sent an army of 5000 men under the command of Khem Nayak (also known as Varunakulattan) to put down the uprising.

== Downfall ==
By June 1619, there were two Portuguese military expeditions to the Jaffna kingdom: a naval expedition which was repulsed by Khem Nayak and his troops, and a land expedition by Filipe de Oliveira and his army of 5,000, which was eventually able to defeat Cankili.

Cankili's remaining soldiers were beheaded by Portuguese without trial. Cankili himself was taken to Goa and brought to trial by a High Court for treason where he was found guilty and sentenced to death by beheading. During his imprisonment, he was constantly visited by priests of the convent of St. Francis. Cankili then declared that he wished to be a Christian. He and his Queen were robed for baptism according to their status, and the priests baptized Cankili under the name Dom Filipe and also baptized his Queen under the name of Dona Margarida of Austria, with Archbishop Dom Frey Cristvao de Lisboa, serving as their godfather. They were baptized in the presence of the great Catholic Church dignitaries with all regal pomp.

Cankili was executed in 1621. According to Fr. Fernao de Queyroz, "A theatre was prepared in the courtyard of the Custom house draped in mourning; on it a carpet with a cushion of red velvet; whither he came accompanied by many Religious of St. Francis who helped him to die well. He did not consent to have his hands tied, saying that it was not necessary because he died for his faults with great pleasure and as he uttered the "sweet name of Jesus" his head was cut off. After his death, he was dressed in the habit of St. Francis as he had asked when living and being carried by the same Religious in procession, he was buried in their Chapter-hall. His queen retired into the house of converts where she lived an exemplary Christian life."

The surviving members of the royal family were also taken to Goa and asked to become monks or nuns in the holy orders. Most obliged, and their celibacy avoided the production of further claimants to the Jaffna throne.

== See also ==
- List of Jaffna monarchs

== Notes ==
Preceded by Ethirimana Cinkam	Jaffna Kingdom; 1617–1619	Succeeded by Filipe de Oliveira
