= Ethirimana Cinkam =

Parasasekaran VIII
- King of Jaffna
- Reign: 1591–1617
- Predecessor: Puviraja Pandaram (Parasasekaran VII)
- Successor: Cankili II (Cekaracacekaran IX)
- Died: 1617
Names
- Ethirimanna Cinkam
- Tamil: எதிர்மன்னசிங்கம்
- House: Aryacakravarti dynasty
- Father: Puviraja Pandaram (Parasasekaran VII)

Ethirimanna Cinkam (Tamil: எதிர்மன்னசிங்கம்) (reigned from 1591 - 1617) was the penultimate ruler of the Aryacakravarti line of Kings of the Jaffna Kingdom in northern Sri Lanka. He came to power due to the second Portuguese expedition led by André Furtado de Mendonça in 1591. In that expedition, the King of Jaffna, Puviraja Pandaram (1561–65, 1582–91) and the father of Ethirimnna Cinkam was killed.

== A client ==
Ethirimanna Cinkam was injured in the battle and was saved by a Portuguese captain Simão Pinhão. Eventually he was installed as client monarch. The conditions imposed were that Catholic missionary activity to be freely allowed and the Elephant export monopoly to be handed over to the Portuguese as well as the tribute to paid by the Kingdom was increased.

== Balancing act ==
But Ethirimanna Cinkam who became the king under the name Parasasekaran VII (1591–1617) interrupted the Catholic missionary activities and the Portuguese monopoly on Elephant exports. He carried out an undercover campaign against the Catholic missionaries and did not look with favor on converts. He interfered with the passage and shipping of Elephants of the Portuguese government through his territories thereby securing advantageous terms for his Elephants. By 1595 the King of Portugal had issued an order to remove him but colonial authorities in Goa did not oblige as Ethirimanna Cinkam was not overly disruptive to Portuguese colonial interests.

== The end ==
He also helped the re-founded Kandyan Kingdom King Vimaladharmasuriya I (1593–1604) and King Senarat (1604–1635) to secure help from South India to resist the Portuguese. Like Bhuvanekabahu VII of Kotte Kingdom through a mixture of native cunning and the ability to perform a delicate balancing act he secured a surprising degree of room for maneuver. He died peacefully in April 1617 leaving a young son as the heir apparent that precipitated events leading to the demise of the Kingdom.

== Notes ==
Preceded by Puviraja Pandaram	Jaffna Kingdom; 1591 –1617	Succeeded by Cankili II
