= Kotte conquest of the Jaffna kingdom =

15th century military conflict

- Part of Wars of Jaffna kingdom
Date	1449–50 and 1453–54
Location	Nallur, Jaffna
Result	Kotte's victory: Kotte captured the Jaffna kingdom; Parakramabahu VI appointed Prince Sapumal as representative of Kotte, and he reigned about 17 years.

Belligerents
Kingdom of Kotte	Jaffna kingdom Vanni chieftaincies (until 1450); Supported by: Vijayanagar Empire

Commanders and leaders
(Kingdom of Kotte) Prince Sapumal	Kanakasooriya Cinkaiariyan

The Kotte conquest of the Jaffna kingdom was an expedition against the Jaffna kingdom by the Kotte kingdom. The Kotte's campaign had several phases against Jaffna dated between A.D. 1449–50 and 1453–54. The first campaign, led by Prince Sapumal, adopted son of Parakramabahu VI in 1450 was failed. In the second campaign, Prince Sapuma defeated Kanakasooriya Cinkaiariyan and ruled the region nearly 17 years as a representative of Kotte.But soon after Kanakasooriya Cinkaiariyan and his two son's returned from Madurai with mercenaries to wrest the Jaffna Kingdom from Kotte's over lordship, thus Jaffna Kingdom became independent again.

== Background ==
Jaffna kingdom was in better peak in terms of power and economy during early 15th century. It had influential control over Palk Strait and extended its domination over Vanni, Puttalam, and Chilaw regions. Vanni principalities were paid tribute to the kingdom. Also, it was able to influence southern kingdoms of the island. The rise of Vijayanagara Empire influenced Southern India and extended its sovereignty to Jaffna. Meanwhile, Kotte kingdom became powerful during the reign of Parakramabahu VI. He made a request to Prince Sapumal for invading Jaffna kingdom as the king wanted to keep him away from Kotte by considering future crown issues. However, Rajaveliya did not mention such causes.

== Campaign ==
Expeditions against the Jaffna kingdom had two phases that were led by Sapumal. The first campaign was able to defeat tributary Vanni states of Jaffna kingdom, but failed to subdue the Jaffna. The support of Vijayanagara Empire was an additional strength to Jaffna forces. It occurred in 1449–50.

Sapumal gathered forces from Kotte and launched the second attack, including center of Jaffna during 1453-4. Jaffna and Kannada forces put up stubborn resistance. Kannada forces had an outpost on the mainland that served as access command to the Jaffna peninsula. Vanniyar leaders and Indian Muslims also helped Jaffna. However, all of them were defeated and Sapumal conquered Jaffna kingdom.

Ancient records that described the Jaffna campaign Yalpana Vaipava Malai and Kokila Saudesaya describe that he had fled to Southern India with his family. But soon after Kanakasooriya Cinkaiariyan and his two son's returned from Madurai with mercenaries to wrest the Jaffna Kingdom from Kotte's overlordship. Thus Jaffna kingdom became independent again.

== Aftermath ==
Parakramabahu VI appointed Prince Sapumal as representative of Kotte and ruler of Jaffna. Sapumal received cooperation from local people including chieftains and the Jaffna army. The newly formed army consisted of Tamil, Malayalis, Tuluvar, and Singhalese. According to Yalpana Vaipava Malai, Sapumal established Nallur city and built Nallur Kandaswamy Kovil. However, there are controversial concepts that say Nallur and temples were established before the arrival of Sapumal.

Also, some scholars say that the campaign end the rule of Aryacakravarti dynasty in Jaffna kingdom as the later kings of Jaffna did not have the title of Aryacakravarti. Sapumal ruled the Jaffna kingdom for 17 years. But after Kanakasooriya Cinkaiariyan and his two son's returned from Madurai with mercenaries to wrest the Jaffna Kingdom from Kotte's over lordship, this Jaffna Kingdom became independent.
