= Flag of the Jaffna kingdom =

Royal Flag of Jaffna kingdom
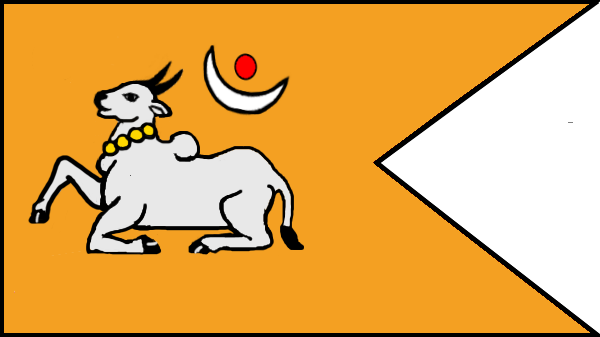
- (Nandi Kodi)
- Adopted: 13th century

The flag of the Jaffna kingdom of the Aryacakravarti line of kings of Jaffna kingdom in northern Sri Lanka consisted of the couchant bull (also called a Nandi), the silver crescent moon with a golden sun. The single sacred conch shell, which spiral open to the right, and in the centre above the sacred bull, is a white parasol with golden tassels and white pearls. The color of the Royal Flag is saffron. The flag symbols are similar to number of flags found in India especially belonging to the Eastern Ganga dynasty. The Setu coins minted by the Aryacakravarti kings also have a similar symbol.

== See also ==
- Flag of Pandya
- Flag of Pallava
- Flags of Tamils
