= Gunaveera Cinkaiariyan =

Gunaveera Cinkaiariyan Pararacacekaran V
- King of Jaffna
- Reign: 1410-1440
- Predecessor: Jeyaveera Cinkaiariyan (Cekaracacekaran V)
- Successor: Kanakasooriya Cinkaiariyan (Cekaracacekaran VI)
Names
- Gunaveera Cinkaiariyan
- Tamil: குணவீர சிங்கையாரியன்
- House: Aryacakravarti dynasty
- Father: Jeyaveera Cinkaiariyan

Gunaveera Cinkaiariyan (Tamil: குணவீர சிங்கையாரியன்) was an Aryacakravarti king of the Jaffna Kingdom. Local sources say that he ruled Jaffna from 1410 or 1440. After his reign, his son Kanakasooriya Cinkaiariyan ruled the Jaffna kingdom

== Notes ==
Preceded by Jeyaveera Cinkaiariyan	Jaffna Kingdom; 1410-1440	Succeeded by Kanakasooriya Cinkaiariyan
