= Kanakasooriya Cinkaiariyan =

Cekaracacekaran VI
- King of Jaffna
- Reign: 1440–1450; 1467–1478
- Predecessor: Gunaveera Cinkaiariyan (Pararacacekaran V); Sapumal Kumaraya
- Successor: Singai Segarasasekaram (Pararacacekaran VI); Sapumal Kumaraya
- Died: 1478
- Issue: Singai Segarasasekaram (Pararacacekaran VI)
Names
- Kanakasooriya Cinkaiariyan
- House: Aryacakravarti dynasty
- Father: Gunaveera Cinkaiariyan (Pararacacekaran V)

Kanakasooriya Cinkaiariyan (reigned from 1440 - 1450 & 1467 - 1478) was the first of the Aryacakravarti dynasty kings of Jaffna Kingdom to lose complete power to a rival king.

== Early reign ==
He inherited the throne from his father Gunaveera Cinkaiariyan in 1440. He was deposed in 1450 by Sapumal Kumaraya a military leader sent by Parakramabâhu VI from the rival Kotte Kingdom in the south. Number of primary sources such as Rajavaliya and Kokila Sandesa written in Sinhalese vividly describe the planning and conquest of the Jaffna Kingdom.

== Exile and restoration ==
Kanakasooriya escaped to Madurai in South India with his two sons. Sapumal Kumaraya ruled Jaffna Kingdom as a sub king and even minted coins in the tradition of Setu coins, the native coins of Jaffna Kingdom. After the death of Parakramabahu VI in 1467, he left Nallur the capital he had rebuilt to Kotte to participate in a struggle to inherit the throne. Although he was victorious and ruled as Srisangabodhi Bhuvanekabhahu, he was unable to prevent Kanakasooriya Cinkaiariyan and his two son's return from Madurai with mercenaries to wrest the Jaffna Kingdom from Kotte's over lordship.

== Notes ==
| Preceded by Gunaveera Cinkaiariyan | Jaffna Kingdom; 1440–1450 | Succeeded by Singai Segarasasekaram |
| Preceded by Sapumal Kumaraya; Kotte Kingdom | Jaffna Kingdom; 1467–1478 | Succeeded by Singai Segarasasekaram |
