= Parakramabahu VI =

King of Kotte from 1410 to 1467

Parakramabahu VI හයවන පරාක්‍රමබාහු
- Siri Sanga bo Tri-Sinhaladīswara (Overlord of Three Sinhala), Navaratnādhipathi (Possessor of nine gems); Tiripuvana-Cakkaravartthi (Emperor of the Three Worlds); Pararājasekharabhujaṅga (Serpent to Pararājasekhara)
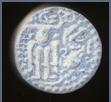
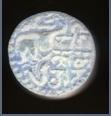
- Obverse coin of Parakramabahu VI (left); Reverse coin of Parakramabahu VI (right)

King of Kotte
- Reign: A.D 1412-1467
- Coronation: 1412
- Predecessor: Weerabahu
- Successor: Jayabahu II
- Died: Kotte
- Burial: Kotte
- Spouse: Queen Consort Swarnamanikya (a Kirawalle Princess) Queen Consort Madura (another Kirawelle Princess) Royal Consort Subadhra
- Issue: Crown Princess Ulakudaya Devi/Lokanatha Princess Chandrawathi Prince Siriwardhana Jayamahalena/ Parakramabahu Jr./ Prince Kanitu Rukule (කනිටු රුකුලේ කුමරු) si:ශ්‍රී වර්ධන Adopted sons Prince Sapumal (Sinhala: සපුමල් කුමාරයා, romanized: Sapumal Kumārayā, Tamil: செண்பகப் பெருமாள், romanized: Ceṇpaka Perumāḷ) later King Bhuvanaikabahu VI, Prince Ambulugala (අම්බුළුගල කුමරු) later king Parakramabahu VIII Prince Rahula/Jayaba also known as Thotagamuwe Sri Rahula Thera
- House: House of Siri Sanga Bo
- Dynasty: Moriya
- Father: Lord Lameni Jayamahalena
- Mother: Mother Queen Sunethra Devi
- Religion: Theravada Buddhism

Parâkramabâhu VI (Sinhala: කෝට්ටේ හයවන පරාක්‍රමබාහු, romanized: Kōṭṭē Haya-vana Parākramabāhu, Tamil: ஆறாம் (VI.) பராக்கிரமபாகு, romanized: Āṟām (VI.) Parākkiramapāku) was the first king of Kotte, ruling from 1410 until his death in 1467. He is the last great king in Sri Lanka who managed to unite the island under one flag. His rule is famous for the renaissance in Sinhalese literature, (especially poetry) due to the patronage of the king himself. Classical literature (prose and verse) as well as many rock inscriptions and royal grant letters (patent letters, sannas) have been found, rendering much information pertaining to this period.

== Early life ==
His father was Lameni Jayamahalena, and his mother was Sunethra Maha Devi. If so, he is the grandson of Parakramabahu V, who was Savulu Vijayabahu's son. Savulu Vijayabahu was the fifth to go by the name Vijayabahu. Another scholar states that Jayamahalena was the grandfather of Parakramabahu VI. However, he is supposed to belong to the family that came after Parakramabahu V.

== Reign ==
=== Kingship ===
Parakramabahu VI was allied with Ming China who forcibly dethroned Alakeshvara in favor of him. As documented in Chinese records, Parakramabahu VI was elected by the Sinhalese present at the Ming court, nominated by the Ming Yongle Emperor, and installed by Admiral Zheng He with the backing of his fleet.

During his reign, economic relations between the Ming dynasty and the Kotte kingdom increased; he sent alteast five diplomatic missions to China in order to confirm that sea piracy in the Sea of Kotte had been abolished. The Galle Trilingual Inscription was also placed by Zheng He during this period.

=== Rebellions ===
King Parakramabahu VI suppressed the revolts in Malayarata. The chiefs of Vanni who wielded power there, were defeated by this king.

=== Vijayanagara Invasion ===
In 1435, a South Indian invasion from the Vijayanagara Empire, is recorded. Sri Lankan sources say that the king that started the invasion successfully but south Indian records contradict this. Soon after this time, king Parâkramabâhu VI directed a naval attack on south Indian ports, resulting from a dispute that arose after the incident of stealing a cargo ship by an Indian called Rayan Malavar around the year 1443.

=== Conquering Yapa Patuna ===
This battle was led by king Parâkramabâhu VI's adopted son, Prince Sapumal. Selalihini Sandeshaya records that the prince returned after winning the Yapa Patuna (Jaffna), about year 1449. The king took advantage that Arya Chakravarthi could no longer get military assistance from Vijayanagara. As troops advanced across Mannar to Jaffna by land, naval forces must have cut south Indian assistance by patrolling the Palk Strait. The first fierce battle happened in Java-Kotte (Chavakacheri) near Elephant pass. Later Jaffna was attacked and Arya Chakravarthi was forced to retreat to India. But after Kanakasooriya Cinkaiariyan and his two son's returned from Madurai with mercenaries to wrest the Jaffna Kingdom from Kotte's over lordship in 1467. Thus Jaffna Kingdom became independent.

=== Rebellion of Jothiya Situ ===
In 1458, Jothiya Situ (or Jotiya Sitana), the regional ruler of Udarata (the Hill Country), rebelled against King Parakramabahu VI by refusing to pay annual tribute and provide labourers for royal service. In response, the king dispatched an army under Prince Ambulugala to suppress the rebellion. Jothiya Situ was defeated and removed from power, and a prince of the Gampola royal family was appointed to govern the region, restoring the authority of the Kingdom of Kotte over the central highlands.

== Demise ==
In year 1463, there was a rebellion in the hill country and Senasammata Vikramabahu became king of Senkadagala. The king died in 1467. And his grand son Jayabahu II became king. But this was followed by much political turmoil. The stability of king Parâkramabâhu VI would not return for centuries to come.

== Contribution to literature ==
King Parakramabahu VI showed a great interest in literature and arts; his patronage contributed to the development of Sinhalese literature, sparking a renaissance in the arts. The period of his reign is considered as a Golden Era in Sinhalese Literature, known as the heyday of 'Sandesha Poetry.'

== Contribution to Buddhism ==
He had built a 'Dalada Maligawa', a 3-floor building that became the repository of tooth relic. In addition to that he constructed a temple in honour of his mother and it is presently the Sunethradevi Pirivena at Pepiliyana.

== See also ==
- Sapumal Kumaraya
- Kingdom of Kotte
- Saddharmarathnakaraya

Parakramabahu VI Born: ? ? Died: ? ?
Regnal titles
Preceded by Parakramabahu Epa	King of Kotte; 1412–1467	Succeeded by Jayabahu II
