= Jayabahu II =

- King of Kotte
- Reign: 1467–1472/3
- Predecessor: Parakramabahu VI
- Successor: Bhuvanekabahu VI
- Died: 1472/3
- House: House of Kotte
- Father: Nallurthan
- Mother: Ulakudaya Devi

Jayabahu II (also known as Vira Parakramabahu) was King of Kotte in the fifteenth century, who ruled from 1467 to 1472/3. He is the grandson of Parakramabahu V and son of Prince Nallurthan of Jaffna Kingdom and Princess Ulakudaya Devi. He succeeded Parakramabahu VI as king of Kotte and was succeeded by Bhuvanekabahu VI.

== See also ==
- List of Sri Lankan monarchs
- History of Sri Lanka

Jayabahu II House of Kotte Born: ? ? Died: ? 1472/3
Regnal titles
Preceded by Parakramabahu VI	King of Kotte; 1467–1472/3	Succeeded by Bhuvanekabahu VI
