= Saddharmarathnakaraya =

- Author: Wimalakiththi Maha Sthavira
- Language: Pali and Sinhala
- Subject: Dhamma (dharma)
- Genre: Religious, Buddhism, Buddha Charitha
- Published: ~1415
- Publication place: Sri Lanka
- Media type: Print

Saddharmarathnakaraya
- Author: Dhammadinnāchārya Vimalakīrti
- Original title: සද්ධර්මරත්නාකරය
- Language: Sinhala, Pali
- Subject: Buddhist literature
- Published: 15th century
- Publication place: Sri Lanka

The Saddharmarathnakaraya (Pali:Saddhammaratanākara); (SInhala:සද්ධර්මරත්නාකරය) is a historical Sinhala Buddhist religious compendium. It was compiled as an explanation of a Pali anthology by Dhammadinnāchārya Vimalakīrti, a pupil of Dharmakīrti Sangharāja at the Palābaddala Monastery during the reign of Parākramabāhu VI of Kotte in the 15th century.

== Etymology ==
The name Saddharmarathnakaraya is a compound of Sad (Noble), Dharma (Teachings of the Buddha), Rathna (Gems), and Ākara (Lode), meaning "The Lode of Gems-like Noble Dharma."

== Historical Context ==
The era of King Parākramabāhu VI (1412–1467), the last native sovereign to unify Sri Lanka, is regarded as the golden age of Sinhala literature. Notable works from this period include:

- Kavyashekaraya
- Panchikapradipikawa by Sri Rahula
- Guththila Kavyaya by Weththewe
- Budugunalankaraya
- Loweda Sangarawa by Vidagama Maithriya
- Elushilo Shathakaya
- The five Sandesha Kavyayas (messenger poetry): Parevi Sandeshaya, Selalihini Sandeshaya, Gira Sandeshaya, Hansa Sandeshaya, and Kokila Sandeshaya

The Saddharmarathnakaraya is the only complete literary work from the Kotte era and is considered the final link in a chain of classical Sinhala literary works, including Amawathura, Buthsarana, Saddharmarathnawaliya, Pujawaliya, and Saddharmalankaraya.

It is believed that this text served as a reference for later works such as Sri Saddharmawawada Sangrahaya and Sarartha Sangrahaya from the Mahanuwara era.

== Structure ==
The text consists of eight Sangraha Kathā (compendiums) and 28 additional topics of discussion, including:

- Prakeernaka Sangraha Katha – Auxiliary compendiums
- Abhinihara Sangraha Katha – Non-exterminated compendiums
- Dashaparamartha Paramitha Sangraha Katha – Ten ultimate realistic perfections
- Abhinishkramana Sangraha Katha – Renunciation compendiums
- Maithriya Sangraha Katha – Loving-kindness compendiums
- Buddhadbhutha Kriya Sangraha Katha – Miraculous acts and superhuman qualities of the Buddha
- Milindu Raja Katha – Discourse on King Milinda
- Sthavira Katha – Discussions on Bhikkhus
- Panchananthardhana Katha – Disappearances of the five Dharmas
- Chakravarti Vibhawana Katha – The appearance of King Chakravarti and his eight treasures
- Dharmadbhutha Katha – The miraculous superiority of Dharma
- Chaithya Katha – Shrines built for eight reasons
- Sammajjhananishansa Katha – Benefits received by Bhikkhus on six occasions
- Mathika Mathu Katha – The mother of Mathu
- Swapna Dipana Katha – Interpretations of prophetic dreams
- Karma Vibhaga Katha – Divisions of Karma
- Sarana Sila Prabheda Katha – Categories of precepts
- Danadi Kushala Sangraha Katha – Alms and karmically wholesome acts

== Purpose and Compilation ==
Dhammadinnāchārya Vimalakīrti, a devoted pupil of Dharmakīrti Sangharāja, was a scholar well-versed in the Nidhanasthana (Treasuries of Consistence), Prabhawasthana (Origins of Consistence), and Upanishrayasthana (Applicable Facts of Consistence). His aim in compiling the Saddharmarathnakaraya was to promote understanding of Buddhist teachings among those with deep faith but limited access to resources.

At the end of the Prakeernaka Sangraha Katha, he writes: > "Accepting respectfully the order of our lord in his supremacy and ultimate kindness, Bhasaye jothaye Dhammang, the bright Dhamma, I am, as a disciple of Lord Buddha, pleased to expound the blessed Dhamma in 'Hela Basa' (the ancient form of Sinhala) for those who, despite lacking wealth and education, possess the devotion to respond and serve."

Additionally, the text was compiled at the request of Wickramabahu Maha Sthavira and Upasaka Weerasundara Kumara, a disciple of the author.

== Legacy ==
The Saddharmarathnakaraya remains a significant contribution to Sinhala Buddhist literature, preserving doctrinal teachings in a form accessible to both monastic and lay audiences.

== See also ==
- Kingdom of Kotte
- Thotagamuwe Sri Rahula Thera
- History of Sri Lanka
- Guththila Kawya
