= Jeyaveera Cinkaiariyan =

Cekaracacekaran V
- King of Jaffna
- Reign: 1380 – 1410
- Predecessor: Virodaya Cinkaiariyan (Pararacacekaran IV)
- Successor: Gunaveera Cinkaiariyan (Pararacacekaran V)
- Died: 1410
- Issue: Gunaveera Cinkaiariyan (Pararacacekaran V)
Names
- Jeyaveera Cinkaiariyan
- Tamil: செயவீர சிங்கையாரியன்
- House: Aryacakravarti dynasty
- Father: Virodaya Cinkaiariyan (Pararacacekaran IV)

Jeyaveera Cinkaiariyan (Tamil: செயவீர சிங்கையாரியன்) reigned from 1380 – 1410 was the Aryacakravarti king of the Jaffna Kingdom in modern-day northern Sri Lanka, who had a military confrontation with a southern chief known as Alagukonar. According to traditional sources, Alagkkonara defeated Jeyaveera's naval and land forces and assumed royal power in the southern Gampola Kingdom. Later, King Harihara II's brother Yuvaraja Virupanna invaded Jaffna peninsula from Karnataka, vassalized jaffna royals and established a pillar of victory there.

Until this defeat all southern kings were paying tribute to the Aryachakravartis. He or his successor is credited with having left behind an inscription in the South Indian Hindu temple Rameswaram about renovating its sanctum sanctorum. It indicated the stones for the renovations were shipped from the city of Trincomalee in present-day eastern Sri Lanka. Most of the inscriptions on the base of the sanctum were either destroyed or removed during a suit between the priests and the Raja of Ramnad in 1866.

He composed as a chronicle in verse the traditional history of the Koneswaram temple, entitled "Dakshina Kailasha Puranam", known today as the Sthala Puranam of Koneshwaram Temple.

== Notes ==
Preceded by Virodaya Cinkaiariyan	Jaffna Kingdom; 1380–1410	Succeeded by Gunaveera Cinkaiariyan
