= Singai Pararasasegaram =

Pararacacekaran VI
- King of Jaffna
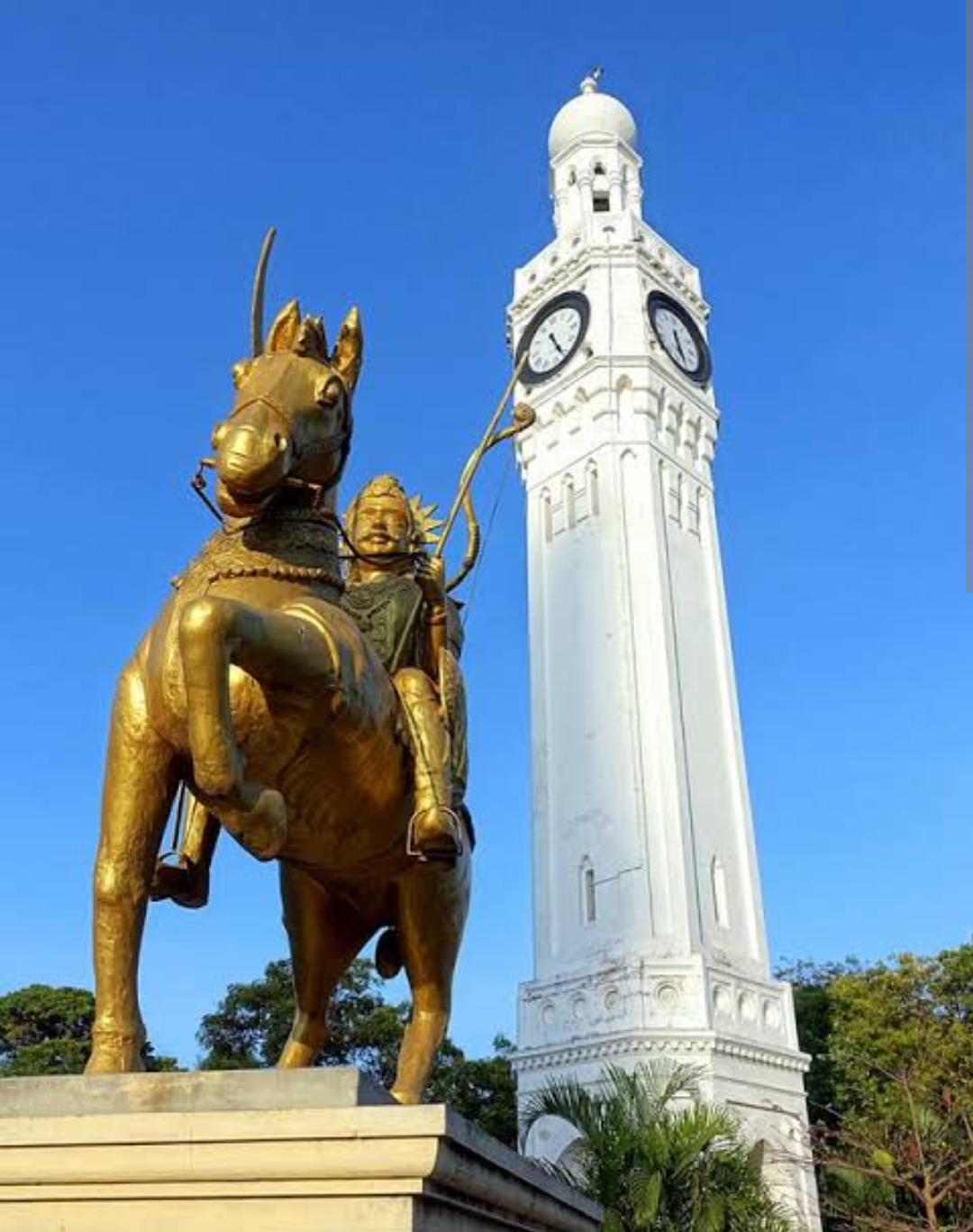
- Pararasasegaram king of jaffana statue
- Reign: 1478–1519
- Predecessor: Kanakasooriya Singaiariyan (Cekaracacekaran VI)
- Successor: Cankili I (Cekaracacekaran VII)
- Died: 1519
- Wives: Rasaletchumi Ammal (Rajalaksmi); Valliammai; Mangathammal
- Issue: Singhabahu; Pandaram; Paranirupasingham; Cankili I (Cekaracacekaran VII); Paravai
Names
- Singai Pararasasegaram
- Tamil: சிங்கைப் பரராசசேகரன்
- House: Aryacakravarti dynasty
- Father: Kanakasooriya Singaiariyan (Cekaracacekaran VI)

Singai Pararasasegaram (Tamil: சிங்கைப் பரராசசேகரன்) (reigned from 1478 - 1519), was one of the most well known kings of the later Aryacakravarti kings of the Jaffna kingdom. He was the father of Cankili I.

== Biography ==
Singai Pararajaseakaram was the first-born son of Kanakasooriya Singaiariyan who lost and then regained the Jaffna kingdom from the rival Kotte kingdom. Singai Pararajasekaram is also the first in line not to use the title Singaiariyan as part of the regnal name. After him all kings had the shorter version Singai as part of the regnal name. After regaining the kingdom, kings such as Singai Pararajasekaram concentrated in developing the core area of the kingdom rather than territorial expansion.

Singai Pararajasekarm had two wives. One Rasaletchumi Ammal, Valliammai and a concubine named Mangathammal. He had eight children through the two wives and one concubine.

== Rule ==
He was known for directing his energies towards consolidating the Kingdom's economic potential by maximising revenue from pearls and elephant exports and land revenue. He is also recognized for his aggressive and violent nature. The kingdom became less feudal than most of other Sri Lanka kingdoms of the same period. Important local Tamil literature was produced and Hindu temples were built during this period including an academy for language advancement.

== Notes ==
| Preceded by Kanakasooriya Singaiariyan | Jaffna Kingdom; 1478 –1519 | Succeeded by Cankili I |
