= Parakramabahu VII =

- King of Kotte
- Reign: 1480/1–1484
- Predecessor: Bhuvanekabahu VI
- Successor: Parakramabahu VIII
- House: House of Kotte
- Father: Bhuvanekabahu VI
- Mother: Queen Consort Dhana Manike
- Religion: Theravāda Buddhist

Parakramabahu VII was King of Kotte in the fifteenth century, who ruled from 1480/1 to 1484. He succeeded his father Bhuvanekabahu VI as king of Kotte and was succeeded by Parakramabahu VIII.

== See also ==
- List of Sri Lankan monarchs
- History of Sri Lanka

Parakramabahu VII House of Kotte Born: ? ? Died: ? ?
Regnal titles
Preceded by Bhuvanekabahu VI	King of Kotte; 1480/1–1484	Succeeded by Parakramabahu VIII
