= Guththila Kawya =

Sinhala poetry by Weththewe Thero

Guththila kawya ගුත්තිල කාව්‍ය
- Author: Weththewe Thero (Sinhala: වෑත්තෑවේ හිමි)
- Language: Sinhala
- Genre: Poetry
- Published: 16th Century
- Publication place: Sri Lanka

Guththila Kawya (Sinhala: ගුත්තිල කාව්‍ය, Anglicized: Guttila Kāvya) is a book of poetry written in the period of the Kingdom of Kotte (1412-1597) by Weththewe Thero.

The book is based on a story of previous birth of Gautama Buddha mentioned on Guththila Jataka in Jataka tales of Gautama Buddha. Guththila kawya contains over 511 poems. The book was written by Weththewe thero as an invitation and extolment of a minister called Salawatha Jayapala, of the Kotte Royal Council (King: VI Parakumba). The book has been written in the era of Kingdom of Kotte (AD 1412 -1597). Poems are explaining a great competition which happened between Guththila and Musila. Guththila kawya's poems have been inscribed with the same rhymes (Sinhala: එළිසමය), alliteration words (Sinhala: අනුප්‍රාසය) and various genres. From the first to 115th poems have been written according to Gee Viritha. Guttila Kawya has around 5 metres. Viz. Mahamegha Viritha, Savisimath Viritha, Solos math Viritha, Dolos math Viritha and Mahapiyum Viritha.

Book has been mentioned how the competition day was held, Exaggeration has been used for this book without causing harm to the included information of the original sources from Guththila Jataka to give a great taste for the readers.

== See also ==
- Jataka tales
