= Setu coins =

Setu coins or Setu bull coins are found in large quantities in the northern part of Sri Lanka and in Southern India. Numismatists have clearly pointed out (Humphry Codrington in his 1924 book Ceylon Coins and Currency, and Michael Mitchiner in his 1978 book Oriental Coins and Their Values) that the traditional design of Sri Lanka standing King Type Copper Massa (coins) of the Jaffna Kingdoms belongs to the Aryacakravarti dynasty from 1284 AD to 1410 AD. Setu coins were previously attributed to the Setupati Princes of Ramanathapuram in South India. There are two series one in the issued from the 13th to the 15th centuries and the other after the brief loss of sovereignty to the rival Kotte kingdom from 1450 to 1467 and reconstitution of the Kingdom. Even during the rule of Sapumal Kumaraya coins were issued in Jaffna that was distinct. Three types of this series are illustrated below. The obverse of these coins have a human figure flanked by lamps and the reverse has the Nandi (bull) symbol, the legend Sethu in Tamil with a crescent moon above.

There are number of categories of these coins. In type I (1) is closely aligned with the Chola copper coins of the 13th century although slightly larger in size. The Tamil Setu replaces the Nāgarī script of Rajaraja I in the cola coins. In type I (2) the blank is even broader but a recumbent bull appears obverse in a vertical position. In the coin type II the seated figure is replaced with a Bull.

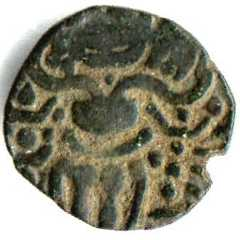
A Setu coin

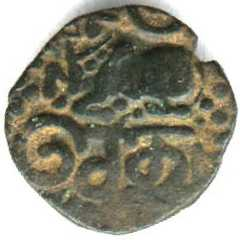
The reverse of the Setu coin

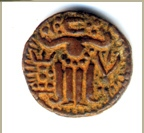
A Setu Bull coin

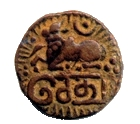
The reverse of the Setu Bull coin

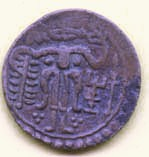
A Setu Bull coin

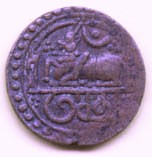
The reverse of the Setu Bull coin
