= Pachilaipalli =

Village in the Northern Province of Sri Lanka

Pachilaipalli (Tamil: பச்சிலைப்பள்ளி Paccilaippaḷḷi) is a village in the Northern Province of Sri Lanka situated in the Jaffna Peninsula. During the Sri Lankan Civil War, the village was strategically important due to its proximity to Elephant Pass, and changed hands multiple times over the course of the war.
