= Bhuvanekabahu VI =

15th century ruler of the Kingdom of Kotte in Sri Lanka

Bhuvanekabahu VI හයවන බුවනෙකබාහු සපුමල් කුමාරයා
- Siri Sanga bo Tri-Sinhaladīswara (overlord of Three Sinhala); Navaratnādhipathi (Possessor of nine gems)
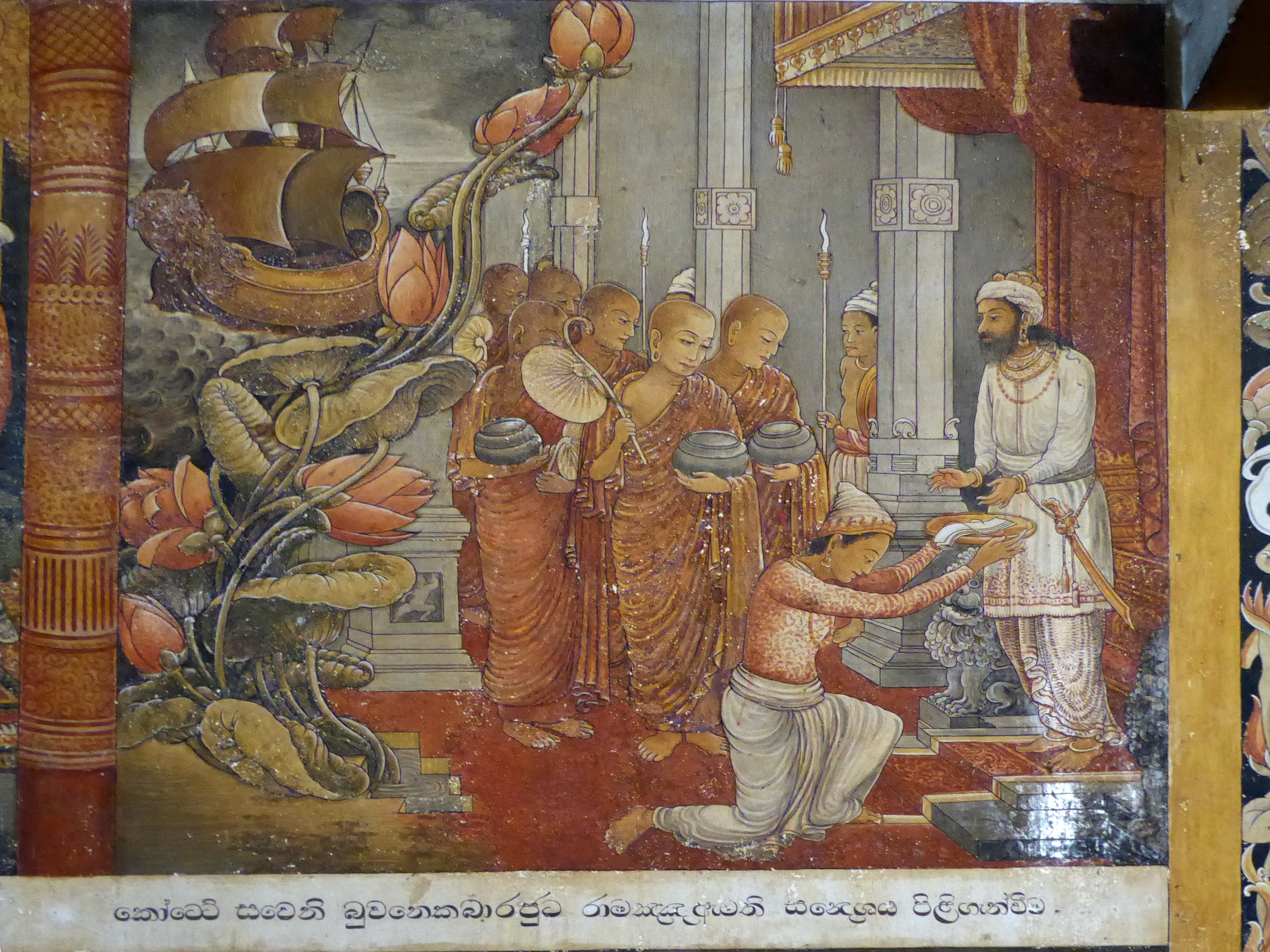
- Bhuvanaikabahu VI receives message from Ramañña Minister

King of Kotte
- Reign: 1469-1477
- Predecessor: Jayabahu II
- Successor: Parakramabahu VII

Chieftain of Jaffna of Kingdom of Kotte
- Reign: 1450-1467
- Predecessor: New office Kanakasooriya Cinkaiariyan (as king of Jaffna)
- Successor: Office abolished Kanakasooriya Cinkaiariyan (as king of Jaffna)
- Spouse: Queen Consort Dhana Manike from Ambalanthota royal family
- Issue: Parakramabahu VII
Names
- Sapumal Bandara; Yudistra Darma Dorai; Chempaka Perumal; Ariavettaiadum Perumal
- House: House of Siri Sanga Bo
- Father: King Parakramabahu VI - adopted father Lord Panikal Prathiraja - father
- Mother: Queen Consort Swarnamanikya Kirawelle - adopted mother Princess Swarnawathi Kirawelle - mother
- Religion: Theravāda Buddhism

Bhuvanekabahu VI of Kotte (Sinhala: හයවන බුවනෙකබාහු, සපුමල් කුමාරයා, romanized: Hayavana Bhuvanekabahu, Sapumal Kumārayā, Tamil: செண்பகப் பெருமாள், romanized: Ceṇpakap Perumāḷ), also known as Sapumal Kumaraya or Yudistra Darma Dorai and Chempaka Perumal, was an adopted son of Parakramabahu VI. His principal achievement was the conquest of Jaffna Kingdom, a historical kingdom of what today is northern Sri Lanka, in 1447 or 1450. Although he was victorious and ruled, he was unable to prevent Kanakasooriya Cinkaiariyan and his two son's return from Madurai with mercenaries to wrest the Jaffna Kingdom from Kotte's over lordship in 1467. Thus Jaffna Kingdom became independent in 1467. Bhuvanaikabahu was apparently summoned south after the demise of his adopted father. He then ruled for 8 years. According to Rajavaliya, he killed the grandson of Parakrama Bahu VI, namely Vira Parakrama Bahu or Jaya Bahu (1468 – c. 1470).

Do Couto, however, who was well-informed, says after a few years' reign Parkramabahu died and his half-witted son was put on the throne by his aunt, who two years later finding herself unable to rule sent for Sapumal Kumaraya from Jaffna.

== Origin theories ==
There are number of theories as to his ethnic origin and the reason for the rebellion against his rule. According to John Holt, he was an ethnic Tamil from the malabar part of the island, whereas other sources say that he may have come from the Malabar region, Tulunadu or the Coromandel Coast.

He has also been identified as adopted by Parakramabahu VI after the death of his father Manikka Thalaivan, a Karaiyar chief, who was killed in a battle mentioned in the manuscript Mukkara Hatana. According to some sources Sapumal was of mixed heritage and had a Sinhalese mother.

He is credited with building the Nallur Kandaswamy temple in Jaffna as well as other temples and Buddhist vihares in the south. The rebellion against him is seen as a reflection of ethnic Sinhalese identity against a perceived outsider.

== Conquest of Jaffna ==
The conquest of the Jaffna kingdom took place in many stages. First, the tributaries to Jaffna in the Vanni area, the Vanniar chieftains of the Vannimai, were neutralised. Two successive invasions followed. The first invasion did not succeed in capturing the kingdom. The second invasion in 1450 eventually did. Apparently connected with this war of conquest was an expedition to Adriampet in modern South India, occasioned, according to Valentyn, by the seizure of a Lankan ship laden with cinnamon. The Tenkasi inscription of Arikesari Parakrama Pandya of Tinnevelly "who saw the backs of kings at Singai, Anurai", and elsewhere, may refer to these wars; it is dated between A.D. 1449–50 and 1453–4. Kanakasooriya Cinkaiariyan the Aryacakravarti king fled to South India with his family. But after Kanakasooriya Cinkaiariyan and his two son's returned from Madurai with mercenaries to wrest the Jaffna Kingdom from Kotte's over lordship, Jaffna Kingdom became Independent.

This victory seemed to have left a very important impression on the Sinhalese literati and political leaders. The glory of Sapumal Kumaraya is sung in the Kokila Sandesaya (Message carried by Kokila bird), written in the fifteenth century by the Principal Thera of the Irugalkula Tilaka Pirivena in Mulgirigala. The book contains a contemporary description of the country traversed on the road by the cookoo bird from Devi Nuwara (City of Gods) in the south to Nallur (Beautiful City) in the north.

"Beloved Kokila, wing the way to Yapa Patuna ( or present day Jaffna). Our Prince Sapumal has driven away from there King Arya Chakravarti, and has established himself in war-like might. To him, I offer this message"

"Arya Chakravarti beheld his glory, dazzling as the glory of the sun. He beheld his might which was poised throughout the eighteen ratas. Thereupon grief entered into his heart, he abandoned his realm and fled beyond the sea".

The return of the prince to Kotte was sung by the poet, Sri Rahula Thera of Totagomuva in the Selalihini Sandesaya (Message carried by the Selalihini bird) thus:

"Dear one, behold, here comes Prince Sapumal, the conqueror of Yapa Patuna [Jaffna].

He is known as Chempaha Perumal as well as Ariavettaiadum Perumal in Tamil sources.

Although he was victorious and ruled as Srisangabodhi Bhuvanekabhahu, he was unable to prevent Kanakasooriya Cinkaiariyan and his two son's return from Madurai with mercenaries to wrest the Jaffna Kingdom from Kotte's over lordship.

== Ascension to the Kotte throne ==
Sapumal Kumaraya also known as Yudistra Darma Dorai ascended the Kotte throne under the name of Bhuvanaika Bahu VI. (c. A.D. 1472–1480 at least). According to Rajaveliya, having heard that Jayabahu (1467-1472 AD) had ascended to the throne, Yudistra arrived from Jaffna, killed Jayabahu, seduced Jayabhu's wife Lavinia and took the throne. An embassy arrived from Pegu for the purpose of obtaining the priestly succession from Lanka in 1476, at a moment when a serious rebellion had broken out. In the chronicles this king is given a reign of seven years from his coronation, but the Dedigama inscription is dated in his ninth year. According to E.W. Codrington, this period was from 1472 to 1480 AD. He was succeeded by his son Pandita Parakrama Bahu VII.

== See also ==
- Mahavamsa
- List of monarchs of Sri Lanka
- History of Sri Lanka

== Notes ==
Preceded by Kanakasooriya Singaiariyan	Jaffna Kingdom; 1450–1467	Succeeded by Kanakasooriya Singaiariyan
Preceded by Parakrama Bahu VI	Kotte Kingdom; 1472–1480	Succeeded by Pandita Parakrama Bahu VII
