= Aryacakravarti dynasty =

Kings of the Jaffna Kingdom in Sri Lanka

Arya Chakravarti
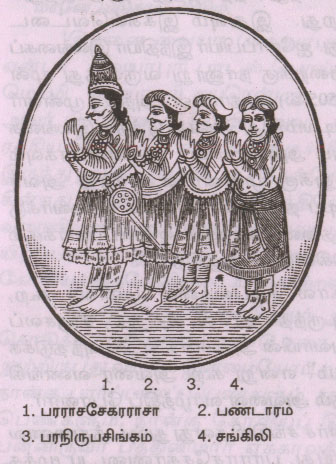
- Country: Sri Lanka
- Founded: 1277 CE
- Founder: Kulasekara Cinkaiariyan
- Final ruler: Cankili II in Jaffna Kingdom
- Titles: Cinkaiariyan, Cetukavalan, Kangkaiariyarkoon
- Estate: Jaffna Kingdom
- Dissolution: 1619
- Cadet branches: None

The Arya Chakravarti dynasty (Tamil: ஆரியச் சக்கரவர்த்திகள் வம்சம், Sinhalese: ආර්ය චක්‍රවර්තී රාජවංශය) were kings of the Jaffna Kingdom in Sri Lanka. The earliest Sri Lankan sources, between 1277 and 1283, mention a military leader of this name as a minister in the services of the Pandyan Empire; he raided the western Sri Lankan coast and took the politically significant relic of the Buddha's tooth from the Sinhalese capital city of Yapahuwa. Political and military leaders of the same family name left a number of inscriptions in the modern-day Tamil Nadu state, with dates ranging from 1272 to 1305, during the late Pandyan Empire. According to contemporary native literature, such as Cekaracecekaramalai, the family also claimed lineage from the Tamil Brahmins of the prominent Hindu pilgrimage temple of Rameswaram in the modern Ramanathapuram District of India. They ruled the Jaffna kingdom from the 13th until the 17th century, when the last of the dynasty, Cankili II, was ousted by the Portuguese.

== Theories of origin ==
The origins of the Aryacakravarti are claimed in contemporary court chronicles; modern historians offer some competing theories.

=== Pandyan feudatory family ===
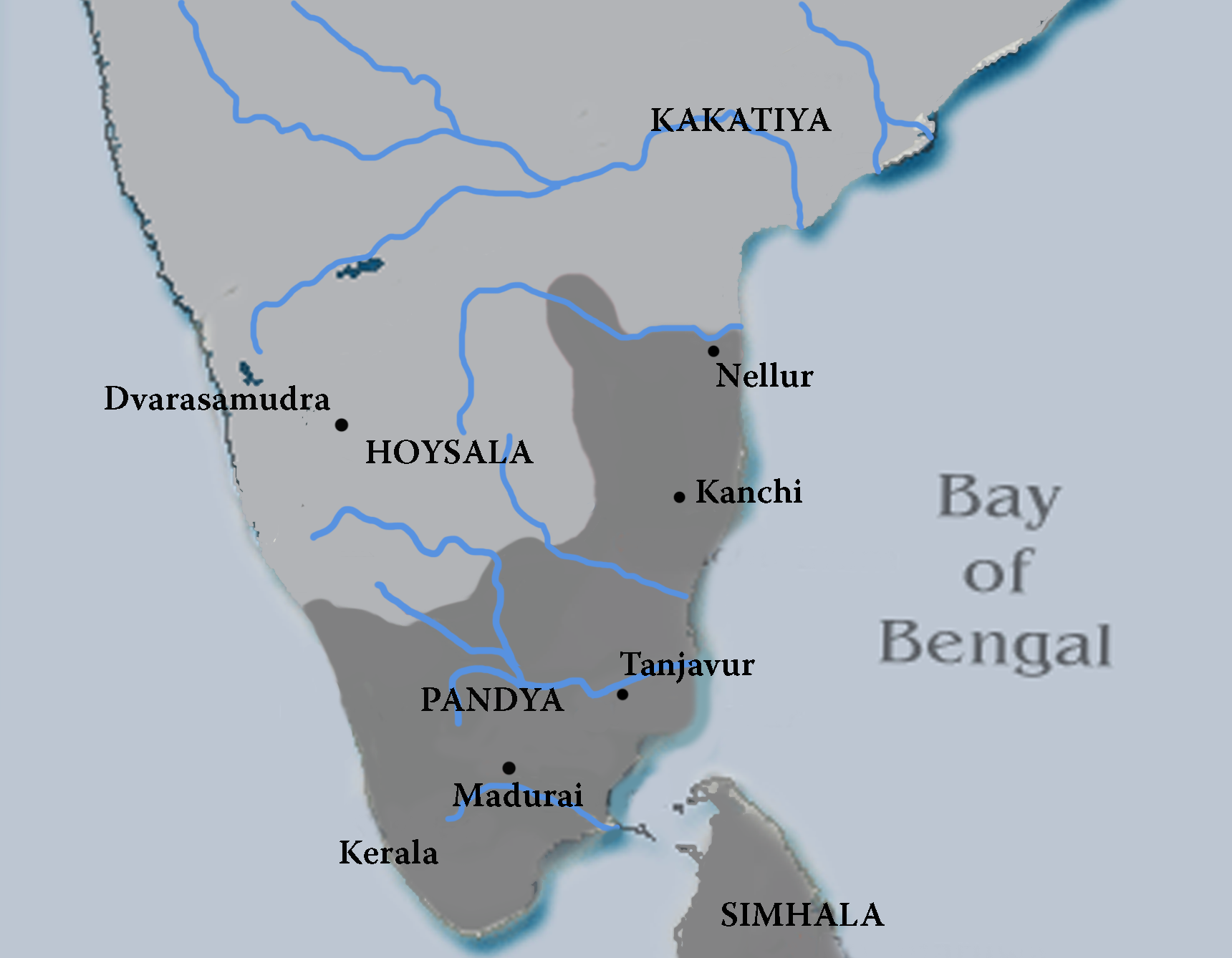
Pandyan tribute-paying territories circa 1250, include what eventually became the Jaffna kingdom in Sri Lanka

From the thirteenth-century inscriptions commemorating dignitaries calling themselves Aryacakravartis in present-day Tamil Nadu we can deduce that they hailed from the coastal region of present-day Ramanathapuram District, which they called Cevvirukkai Nadu. They administered land and held important military ranks. It is believed that most of them belonged to the modern Ramanathapuram District who had become prominent during the days of the Pandyan king Maravarman Kulasekaran. The kings of Jaffna Kingdom claimed the title Sethukavalar meaning "the guardian of Cetu".

Furthermore, the title Cakravarti seem to have been commonly used in the Pandyan kingdom as a caste or job title. Compound titles exist, such as Maravacakravarti that belonged to a Maravar chief as well as Malavacakravarti that belonged to a Malava chief. Ariyar in Tamil could denote a noble or a learned person, a Brahmin or alternatively a person from Aryavarta. Thus the title Ariyacakravarti seems to fit the structure of similarly used titles across the Pandyan kingdom. Inscriptions of 12th century mentions that the title Ariyacakravarti was a title earned in the military service under the Pandyan kingdom, the title is frequently referenced in the inscription of Maravarman Kulasekaran in Ramanthapuram.

Some of the dignitaries noted in the inscriptions are one Devar Arayacakravarti, Alakan Arayacakravarti, Minatungan Arayacakravarti and Iraman Arayacakravarti of whom Devar Arayacakravarti has at least two known inscriptions of which one at Sovapuri in Ramanathapuram in 1272 is the earliest. He caused a second inscription (1305) in Tirupulani in Ramanathapuram to be engraved thus indicating he was a minister or a feudatory. Notably the inscriptions also had the epithet Sethumukam signifying "in the order of Sethu."

According to a Sinhalese primary source Culavamsa, a warlord or minister named Aryacakravarti invaded the Sinhalese capital of Yapahuwa on behalf of the Pandyan king Maaravarman Kulasekaran between the years 1277–1283 and took the politically significant Buddha's tooth relic.

=== Brahmins from Rameswaram ===
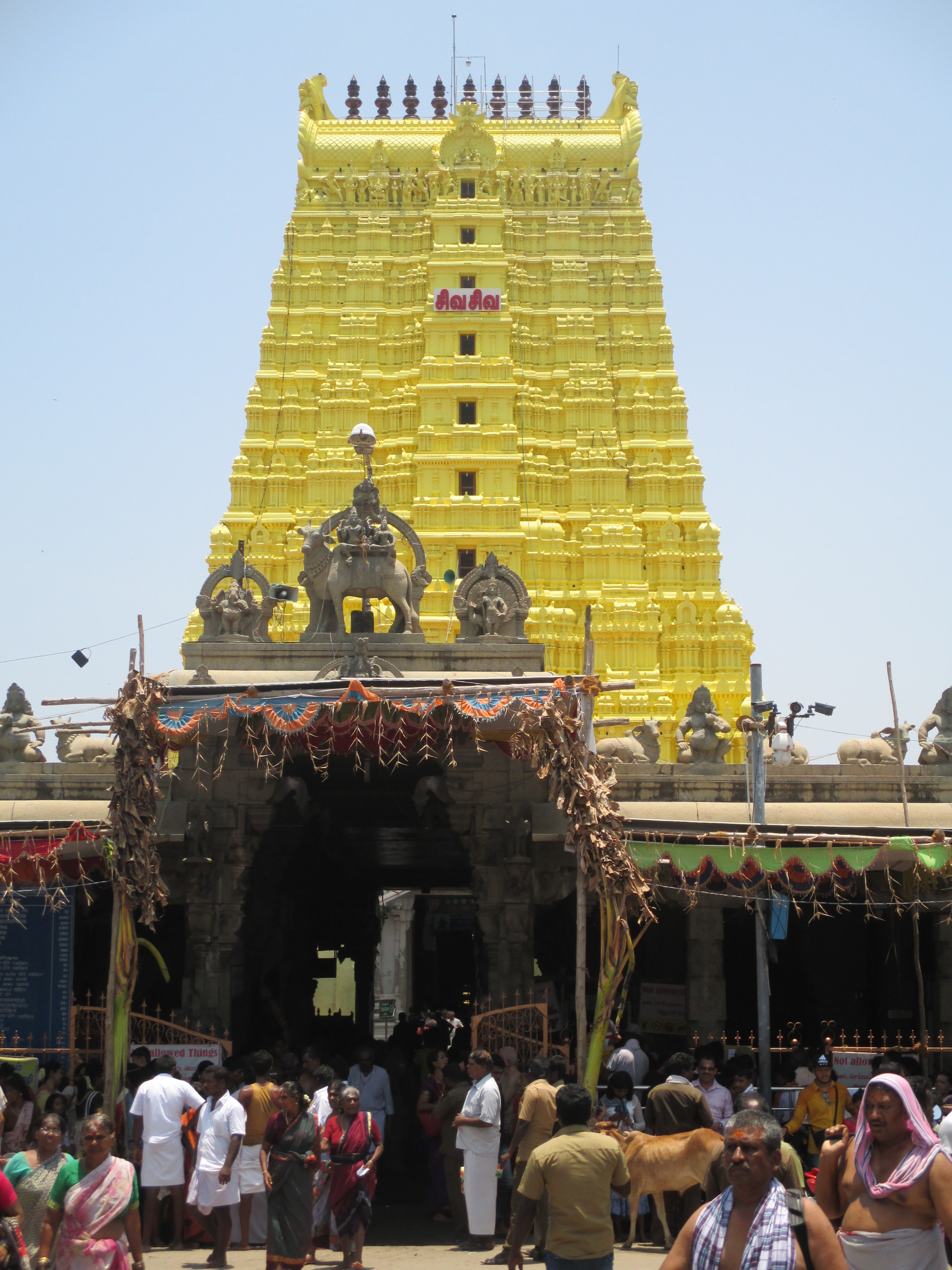
Rameswaram temple – Aryacakravarti kings claimed origin as Tamil Brahmin priests of Pasupata sect from this temple

The Cekaracecekaramalai written during the Aryacakravarti rule in Jaffna asserts that the direct ancestors of the Kings belonged to a group of 512 Ariyar (a Brahmin priestly caste) of the Pasupata sect of the Rameswaram Hindu temple. The source also claims that two out of the 512 were selected as Kings of Ariyars. It also explains that a direct ancestor of the kings was a scribe in the Pandyan kingdom and was called during a war with other kingdoms to assist the king, and that the ancestors of the kings fought in wars against kings in the Hoysala and Karnataka.

During Jatavarman Sundara Pandyan's rule the Pandyas overwhelmed their Hoysala enemies and killed the Hoysala monarch Vira Someshwara in 1254.

A study of their epithets, such as Teevaiyarkoon ("King of Teevai"), Kantamalayaariyarkoon ("Ariyan King of Kantamalai") and Ceetukaavalan ("Protector of Cetu") confirms their connections to Rameswaram Hindu temple, as Teevai, Cetu and Kantamalai are all names for the same location: Rameswaram.

=== Ganga dynasty ===
In the opinion of Rasanayagam Mudaliar and Swami Gnanapragasar the Aryacakravarti dynasty was connected to the Eastern Ganga Dynasty. Rasanayagam believes that a Brahmin from the town of Rameswaram married into the surviving family members of the Kalinga Magha, an invader claiming to be from Kalinga kingdom in India. Magha apparently belonged to the Eastern Ganga Dynasty. The Royal flag of the Jaffna kingdom is similar to the Royal insignia of the Eastern Gangas. Gangas themselves also claimed Brahmin origins. The Setu coins minted by the Aryacakravarti kings also have a similar symbol.

Swami Gnanapragasar believes that the first Ariyacakravarti also called Cinkaiariyan (Ariyan from Cinkainakar) was Kalinga Magha himself. Three main arguments are adduced to support the claim that these kings were of Eastern Ganga descent. The first is the similar device on their coins; the bull couchant and the crescent surmounting it were struck on coins issued by the Eastern Gangas and Ariyacakravartis. The second is the traditions of their origins are almost identical. The last is the assumption of titles Kangkainaadan (From the country of Ganges) and Kangkaiariyan (Ariyan from the Ganga dynasty). According to S. Pathmanathan's history of the Jaffna kingdom, these only establish similarity, but not any conclusive direct connections. Pathmanathan believes that we cannot categorically link the Aryacakravarti dynasty with Eastern Gangas and can explain most of the similarities based on influence, even Western Ganga Dynasty descendants who had moved into Tamil lands after their defeat by the Chola Empire around the year 1000 and interpret them simply as reflecting a claim of origin from the Hindu holy city of Varanasi on the banks of the holiest river Ganges.

=== Javaka-Kalinga invaders ===
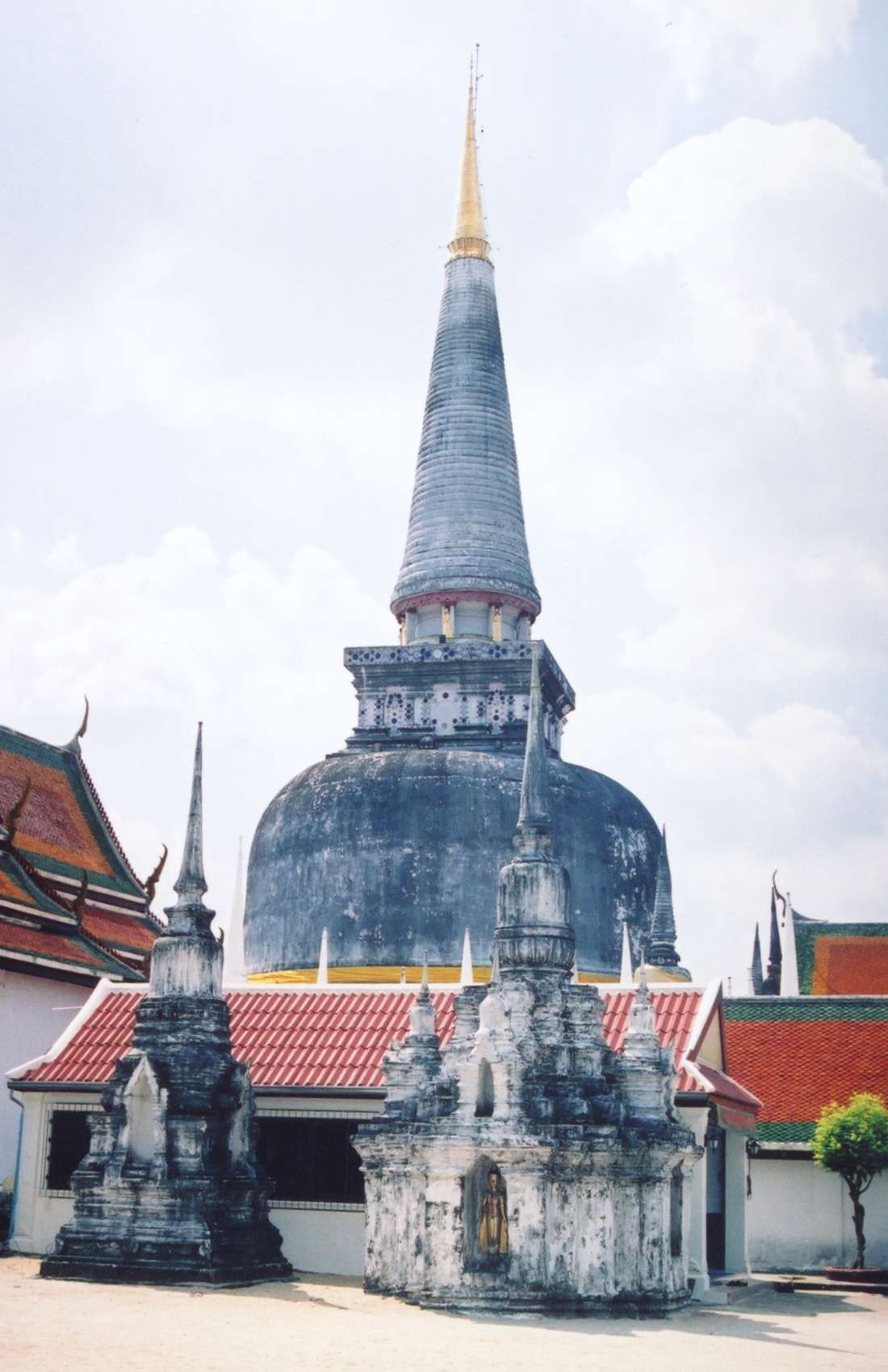
The Buddhist stupa Chedi Phrae Boromadhatu built by Chandrabhanu of the Padmavamsa lineage in Tambralinga (now Thailand)

S. Paranavitana offered a novel surmise explaining the origins of the Ariyacakravarti. According to him the Aryacakravarti are descendants of Chandrabhanu a Malay chieftain, who invaded the island from Tambralinga in 1247. According to him refugees and immigrants from the Indian kingdom of Kalinga founded similarly named Kingdoms in South East Asia, and some of them came due to various reasons to north Sri Lanka and founded the Jaffna Kingdom. This view has been refuted by noted Indian historian K.A. Nilakanta Sastry as having no credible evidence, and other historians such as Louis Charles Damais (1911–1966), an expert on Indonesian studies, Yutaka Iwamoto (1910–1988), a Buddhist scholar, and S. Pathmanathan. They assert that there were no kingdoms in South East Asia called Kalinga and such assertions are based on erroneous readings of the Chinese name for a locality called Ho-ling which actually stood for Walain not Kalinga. Further S. Pathmanathan asserts that Chandrabhanu had categorically claimed Padmavamsa lineage whereas S. Paranavitana had adduced a Gangavamsa lineage to the Aryacakravarti. Further he notes that the inscriptions that S. Paranavitana used to make his theory have not been deciphered by any other scholar to imply a Javaka connection to the Aryacakravartis.

== Other sources ==
=== Contemporary chronicles ===
The earliest local Tamil chronicles on Jaffna Kingdom were composed in the Middle Ages. A prose work,Yalpana Vaipava Malai, compiled by poet Mayilvakana Pulavar in 1736, cites four earlier writings such as Kailaya Malai, Vaiya Padal, Pararasasekaran Ula and Rasamurai as its source. Of which Rasamurai (or list of kings) has not been found and all what we know about is through Yalpana Vaipava Malai. These, composed not earlier than the 14th century, contain folkloric legends mixed with historical anecdotes. But an astrological work, Cekarasacekara Malai, written during the rule of Cekarasacekaran V (1410–1440) by Soma Sarman has verifiable historical information and has been used extensively by historians from Humphrey Coddrington to S. Pathmanathan to reconstruct the kingdom's early history.

The Sinhalese chronicles, such as Culavamsa, Rajavaliya and a number of Sandesya chronicles, such as Kokila Sandesaya and Selalihini Sandesaya, have valuable information on the early and middle period of the kingdom, its activities and its eventual occupation by the rival Kotte Kingdom in 1450–1467. Culavamsa mentions in detail the arrival and the conquest of the Sinhalese capital Yapahuwa by a minister named Aryacakravarti during the period 1277 to 1283. It also mentions that the minister carried away the Budha's relic from the capital to Pandyan Kingdom. The Rajavaliya a primary source written during the 17th century refers to the fact that the Aryacakravartis collected taxes from Udarata and southern lowlands.

The conquest by a certain Sapumal Kumaraya, a military leader sent by the Kotte king, seemed to have left an indelible impression on the Sinhalese literati. The victory of Sapumal Kumaraya is sung in the Kokila Sandesaya ("Message carried by Kokila bird") written in the 15th century by the principal monk of the Irugalkula Tilaka Pirivena in Mulgirigala. The book contains a contemporary description of the country traversed on the road by the cookoo bird from Devi Nuwara ("City of Gods") in the south to Nallur ("Beautiful City") in the North of Sri Lanka.

Beloved Kokila, wing the way to Yapa Patuna. Our Prince Sapumal has driven away from there King Arya Chakravarti, and has established himself in war-like might. To him, I offer this message. Arya Chakravarti beheld his glory, dazzling as the glory of the sun. He beheld his might which was poised throughout the eighteen ratas. Thereupon grief entered into his heart, he abandoned his realm and fled beyond the sea.

=== Inscriptions ===
Lahugala

Parakramabahu V (1344–59) a king of Gampola who ruled from Dedigama retreated to the southeast of the island, to a place called Magul Maha Viharaya in the Ampara District after a confrontation with the Aryacakravarti. This is evident from inscriptions in a place called Lahugala.

Medawela

The Medawala inscriptions dated 1359 found near a bo-tree at Medawala in Harispattuva reveal that Martanda Cinkaiariyan appointed tax collectors to collect taxes from the villages belonging to the Gampola kingdom.

Kotagama

The Kotagama inscriptions found in Kegalle District are a record of victory left by the Aryacakravarti kings of the Jaffna Kingdom in western Sri Lanka. The inscription was assigned to the 15th century by H.C.P. Bell, an archeologist, and Mudaliar Rasanayagam, based on paleographic analysis of the style of letters used. If this late date is to be accepted then this inscription stands in contrast to generally accepted theory based on Sinhalese literature that Alagakkonara the local chieftain who confronted the Aryacakravarti kings in 1391 was victorious in his effort.

Rameswaram temple

Jeyaveera Cinkaiariyan or his successor is credited with an inscription dated 1414 in the South Indian Hindu temple Rameswaram about renovating its sanctum sanctorum. It indicated that the stones for the renovations were shipped from the city of Trincomalee in present-day eastern Sri Lanka. This inscription was destroyed in 1866.

Tenkasi Ten

The Tenkasi Ten inscription of Arikesari Parakrama Pandya of Tinnevelly who saw the backs of kings at Singai, Anurai,' and elsewhere, may refer to kings of Singai and Anurai. Singai or Cinkainakar being the capital of Arayacakravartis and Anurai the name for any Sinhalese capital; it is dated between 1449/50 and 1453/54.

=== Travelogues ===
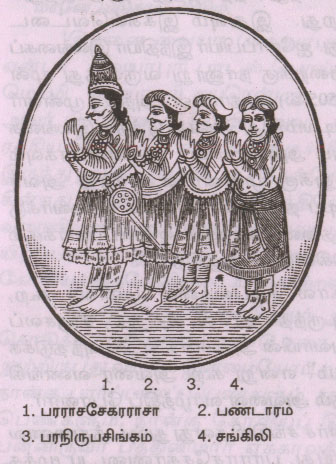
Image of Singai Parasasekaran, his sons Pandaram, Paranirupsingan and Cankili I

Marco Polo

Marco Polo was a Venetian trader and explorer who gained fame for his worldwide travels. These were recorded in the book Il Milione ("The Million" or The Travels of Marco Polo). He reached a port in the northern part of present-day Sri Lanka between 1292 and 1294. According to him the local king was an independent ruler who did not pay tribute to any other monarchs. He named the king as Cantheman, which is considered to be a corruption of Cinkaiariyan. Polo's was followed by a visit by John of Montecorvino, who was a Franciscan missionary, traveller and statesman. He wrote in December 1291 (or 1292), the earliest noteworthy account of the Coromandel coast furnished by any Western European. According to him, he saw the wreckage of sixty seagoing vessels in the general area of Jaffna.

Ibn Batuta

Abu Abdullah Muhammad Ibn Battuta was a Moroccan Berber scholar and jurisprudent from the Maliki Islamic law, and at times a Qadi or judge. He is best known as a traveler and explorer. He spent a few days as a guest of an Aryacakravarti in 1344 and wrote a detailed account of his encounter. According to him, the king controlled the economically important pearlfishing trade in the Palk Straights and had trading links with countries as far as Yemen. The monarch also spoke Persian and was located in the western coastal area of the island, in Puttalam region. He was also noted as receiving tribute of cinnamon from other southern rulers.

Giovanni de Marignolli

Giovanni de' Marignolli, a notable traveller to the Far East in the 14th century, came to Sri Lanka sometimes between 1330 and 1350. He wrote in great detail about the country, its peoples and customs. According to him, the northern part of the island was ruled by a queen, with whom he had many audiences, who also lavished him with precious gifts. This queen is considered to be the mother of an Aryackaravarti and a regent who ruled on behalf of her young son. The so-called "Catalan Map" drawn in 1375 also indicates that northern Sri Lanka was ruled by a queen. Before Marignolli, there was another traveler, Friar Ordrick, who landed in Jaffna in 1322; he also wrote about the prosperity of the kingdom. According him

"The gold, silver and pearls this king had in his possession cannot be found anywhere else in the world".

=== Portuguese colonial documents ===
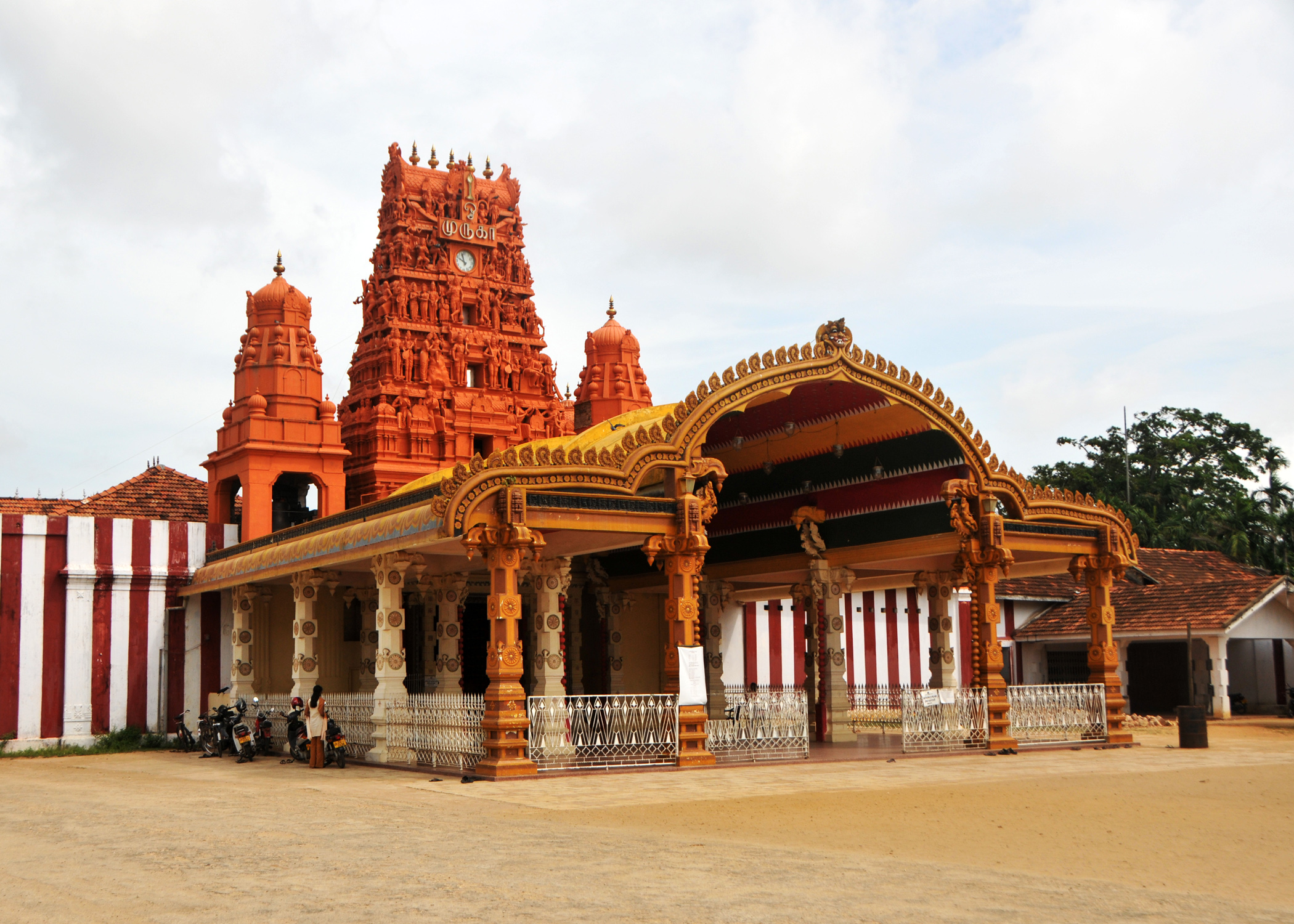
Tradition claims that the Nallur Kandaswamy Temple was constructed by the first Aryacakravarti king.

In his Temporal and Spiritual Conquest of Ceylon, Father Queroz records a tradition as

In course of time, there came some Brahmanes, natives of Guzarata called Arus, who claiming royal descent; and with the favor of Nayque of Madura, they erected a pagoda at Ramancor, whence they began to have trade and friendship with the king of Jaffnapatae, and one of them married a daughter of the king; and finally her descendants became heirs to the Kingdom.

This rendition is fraught with many errors but the basic story line seems to fit the modern consensus. Father Queroz's time line is also anachronistic. The Aryacakravarti dynasty came to power long before the ascendancy of the Madurai Nayaks as well as the Brahmins of Rameswaram had established a temple even longer before. Also the Gujarati origin of the Kings paternal line also in not in conformance with native claims of origin from the city of Varanasi which is in today's Uttar Pradesh not in the historical Gujarat.

== Current consensus ==
The current consensus held by historians such as S. Pathmanathan, Patrick Peebles and K.M. de Silva is that the Aryacakravartis were a Pandyan feudatory family that took power after the chaos created by the invasions of Kalinga Magha and Chandrabhanu. That the family was connected to the Ramanathapuram Hindu temple and was of Tamil Brahmin origin. It may have married into the family of Eastern Gangas or even for that matter the Chandrabanu's successors, but the direct undeniable evidence for it is lacking. The influence of Eastern gangas in its royal flag and the coins is indisputable. Kulingai Cakravarti mentioned by the Tamil chronicles of the Kingdom may have been Kalingha Magha.
