= Puttalam (disambiguation) =

Puttalam is a town in North Western Province, Sri Lanka.

Puttalam may also refer to:

- Puttalam District, district in western Sri Lanka
  - Puttalam Lagoon, large lagoon in the Puttalam District
  - Puttalam Divisional Secretariat, divisional secretariat of Puttalam District
  - Puttalam Electoral District, electoral district in Sri Lanka
    - Puttalam Electoral District (1947–1989), previously existing electoral district
    - Puttalam Polling Division, polling division in the Puttalam electoral district
