= Ministry of Civil Aviation =

Ministry of Civil Aviation may refer to:

- Ministry of Civil Aviation (Egypt)
- Ministry of Civil Aviation (India)
- Ministry of Civil Aviation (Somaliland)
- Ministry of Civil Aviation (Sri Lanka)
- Ministry of Civil Aviation (Soviet Union)
- Ministry of Civil Aviation (United Kingdom)
