= Buddhadasa (name) =

Buddhadasa is a Buddhist title, as well as a given name and a surname. Notable people with the name include:

- Buddhadasa (1906–1993), Thai Buddhist monk
- Buddhadasa of Anuradhapura, King of Anuradhapura
- Buddhadasa Vithanarachchi (born 1947), Sri Lankan actor
- A. M. Buddhadasa, Sri Lankan politician
- Lal Chamika Buddhadasa, Sri Lankan politician
