= Chamika =

Chamika is a given name. Notable people with the name include:

- Chamika Bandara (born 1980), Sri Lankan cricketer
- Chamika Gunasekara (born 1999), Sri Lankan cricketer
- Chamika Karunaratne (born 1996), Sri Lankan cricketer
- Lal Chamika Buddhadasa, Sri Lankan politician
