= Hector Appuhamy =

Sri Lankan politician

Hon. Hector Appuhamy MP
- හෙක්ටර් අප්පුහාමි ஹெக்டர் அப்புஹாமி

Member of Parliament for Puttalam District
- Incumbent
- Assumed office 2015

Personal details
- Party: United National Party
- Other political affiliations: Samagi Jana Balawegaya

Hector Appuhamy is a Sri Lankan politician and a member of the Parliament of Sri Lanka. He was elected from Puttalam District in 2015. He is a Member of the United National Party.

Appuhamy haa served on the environmental oversight committee.
