= Anton Jayakody =

Sri Lankan politician

Anton Jayakody is a Sri Lankan politician. He was elected to the Sri Lankan Parliament from Puttalam Electoral District as a member of the National People's Power.
