= Wennappuwa Polling Division =

Wennappuwa
- Polling Division
- Coordinates: 7.307792°N 79.880159°E
- Country: Sri Lanka
- Province: North Western Province, Sri Lanka
- Electoral District: Puttalam Electoral District

Area
  - Total: 127.49 km^{2} (49.22 sq mi)

Population (2012)
  - Total: 130,510
  - Density: 1,024/km^{2} (2,650/sq mi)
- ISO 3166 code: EC-16E

The Wennappuwa Polling Division is a Polling Division in the Puttalam Electoral District, in the North Western Province, Sri Lanka.

== Presidential Election Results ==
=== Summary ===
The winner of Wennappuwa has matched the final country result 7 out of 8 times making Wennappuwa a bellweather for presidential elections.

Year	Wennappuwa	Puttalam Electoral District	MAE %	Sri Lanka	MAE %
2019	SLPP	SLPP	8.53%	SLPP	6.91%
2015	UPFA	NDF	3.36%	NDF	4.65%
2010	UPFA	UPFA	1.45%	UPFA	2.14%
2005	UPFA	UNP	1.91%	UPFA	0.28%
1999	PA	PA	1.32%	PA	1.14%
1994	PA	PA	1.67%	PA	1.46%
1988	UNP	UNP	1.41%	UNP	5.45%
1982	UNP	UNP	0.95%	UNP	5.19%
Matches/Mean MAE	7/8	7/8	2.57%	8/8	3.40%

=== 2019 Sri Lankan Presidential Election ===
Party	Wennappuwa		Puttalam Electoral District		Sri Lanka	
Party	Votes	%	Votes	%	Votes	%
SLPP	45,969	59.29%	230,760	50.83%	6,924,255	52.25%
NDF	26,624	34.34%	199,356	43.91%	5,564,239	41.99%
NMPP	2,902	3.74%	12,912	2.84%	418,553	3.16%
Other Parties (with < 1%)	2,035	2.62%	10,948	2.41%	345,452	2.61%
Valid Votes	77,530	99.09%	453,976	99.02%	13,252,499	98.99%
Rejected Votes	714	0.91%	4,478	0.98%	135,452	1.01%
Total Polled	78,244	71.25%	458,454	76.53%	13,387,951	83.71%
Registered Electors	109,810		599,042		15,992,568	

=== 2015 Sri Lankan Presidential Election ===
Party	Wennappuwa		Puttalam Electoral District		Sri Lanka	
Party	Votes	%	Votes	%	Votes	%
UPFA	39,523	52.46%	197,751	48.97%	5,768,090	47.58%
NDF	35,218	46.75%	202,073	50.04%	6,217,162	51.28%
Other Parties (with < 1%)	598	0.79%	4,026	1.00%	138,200	1.14%
Valid Votes	75,339	99.05%	403,850	98.95%	12,123,452	98.85%
Rejected Votes	722	0.95%	4,300	1.05%	140,925	1.15%
Total Polled	76,061	71.63%	408,150	72.50%	12,264,377	78.69%
Registered Electors	106,183		562,984		15,585,942	

=== 2010 Sri Lankan Presidential Election ===
Party	Wennappuwa		Puttalam Electoral District		Sri Lanka	
Party	Votes	%	Votes	%	Votes	%
UPFA	40,931	60.34%	201,981	58.70%	6,015,934	57.88%
NDF	26,023	38.36%	136,233	39.59%	4,173,185	40.15%
Other Parties (with < 1%)	879	1.30%	5,899	1.71%	204,494	1.97%
Valid Votes	67,833	99.31%	344,113	99.17%	10,393,613	99.03%
Rejected Votes	471	0.69%	2,886	0.83%	101,838	0.97%
Total Polled	68,304	68.46%	346,999	68.97%	10,495,451	66.70%
Registered Electors	99,774		503,106		15,734,587	

=== 2005 Sri Lankan Presidential Election ===
Party	Wennappuwa		Puttalam Electoral District		Sri Lanka	
Party	Votes	%	Votes	%	Votes	%
UPFA	33,040	50.13%	160,686	48.14%	4,887,152	50.29%
UNP	32,191	48.84%	169,264	50.71%	4,706,366	48.43%
Other Parties (with < 1%)	675	1.02%	3,833	1.15%	123,521	1.27%
Valid Votes	65,906	99.04%	333,783	98.95%	9,717,039	98.88%
Rejected Votes	637	0.96%	3,536	1.05%	109,869	1.12%
Total Polled	66,543	69.39%	337,319	70.56%	9,826,908	69.51%
Registered Electors	95,892		478,032		14,136,979	

=== 1999 Sri Lankan Presidential Election ===
Party	Wennappuwa		Puttalam Electoral District		Sri Lanka	
Party	Votes	%	Votes	%	Votes	%
PA	30,149	53.00%	141,725	51.47%	4,312,157	51.12%
UNP	24,449	42.98%	121,615	44.17%	3,602,748	42.71%
JVP	1,583	2.78%	7,876	2.86%	343,927	4.08%
Other Parties (with < 1%)	700	1.23%	4,123	1.50%	176,679	2.09%
Valid Votes	56,881	98.14%	275,339	97.94%	8,435,754	97.69%
Rejected Votes	1,076	1.86%	5,778	2.06%	199,536	2.31%
Total Polled	57,957	69.26%	281,117	68.85%	8,635,290	72.17%
Registered Electors	83,686		408,331		11,965,536	

=== 1994 Sri Lankan Presidential Election ===
Party	Wennappuwa		Puttalam Electoral District		Sri Lanka	
Party	Votes	%	Votes	%	Votes	%
PA	33,874	61.07%	165,795	62.65%	4,709,205	62.28%
UNP	21,004	37.87%	95,211	35.98%	2,715,283	35.91%
Other Parties (with < 1%)	585	1.05%	3,629	1.37%	137,040	1.81%
Valid Votes	55,463	98.24%	264,635	98.26%	7,561,526	98.03%
Rejected Votes	994	1.76%	4,689	1.74%	151,706	1.97%
Total Polled	56,457	71.54%	269,324	69.80%	7,713,232	69.12%
Registered Electors	78,919		385,854		11,158,880	

=== 1988 Sri Lankan Presidential Election ===
Party	Wennappuwa		Puttalam Electoral District		Sri Lanka	
Party	Votes	%	Votes	%	Votes	%
UNP	28,407	57.29%	125,339	55.89%	2,569,199	50.43%
SLFP	20,234	40.81%	94,823	42.28%	2,289,857	44.95%
SLMP	941	1.90%	4,093	1.83%	235,701	4.63%
Valid Votes	49,582	98.54%	224,255	98.70%	5,094,754	98.24%
Rejected Votes	736	1.46%	2,965	1.30%	91,499	1.76%
Total Polled	50,318	75.96%	227,220	70.70%	5,186,256	55.87%
Registered Electors	66,244		321,387		9,283,143	

=== 1982 Sri Lankan Presidential Election ===
Party	Wennappuwa		Puttalam Electoral District		Sri Lanka	
Party	Votes	%	Votes	%	Votes	%
UNP	28,801	60.45%	128,877	59.12%	3,450,815	52.93%
SLFP	17,293	36.29%	80,006	36.70%	2,546,348	39.05%
JVP	1,318	2.77%	7,001	3.21%	273,428	4.19%
Other Parties (with < 1%)	235	0.49%	2,096	0.96%	249,460	3.83%
Valid Votes	47,647	99.40%	217,980	99.09%	6,520,156	98.78%
Rejected Votes	289	0.60%	1,995	0.91%	80,470	1.22%
Total Polled	47,936	84.27%	219,975	81.41%	6,600,626	80.15%
Registered Electors	56,885		270,207		8,235,358	

== Parliamentary Election Results ==
=== Summary ===
The winner of Wennappuwa has matched the final country result 7 out of 7 times. Hence, Wennappuwa is a Perfect Bellwether for Parliamentary Elections.

Year	Wennappuwa	Puttalam Electoral District	MAE %	Sri Lanka	MAE %
2015	UNP	UNP	2.82%	UNP	2.84%
2010	UPFA	UPFA	3.88%	UPFA	1.49%
2004	UPFA	UPFA	1.82%	UPFA	4.35%
2001	UNP	UNP	2.14%	UNP	3.60%
2000	PA	PA	1.89%	PA	3.63%
1994	PA	PA	1.44%	PA	2.84%
1989	UNP	UNP	3.91%	UNP	9.32%
Matches/Mean MAE	7/7	7/7	2.56%	7/7	4.01%

=== 2015 Sri Lankan Parliamentary Election ===
Party	Wennappuwa		Puttalam Electoral District		Sri Lanka	
Party	Votes	%	Votes	%	Votes	%
UNP	32,421	48.38%	180,185	51.81%	5,098,916	45.77%
UPFA	31,033	46.31%	153,130	44.03%	4,732,664	42.48%
JVP	3,014	4.50%	12,211	3.51%	544,154	4.88%
Other Parties (with < 1%)	544	0.81%	2,263	0.65%	82,383	0.74%
Valid Votes	67,012	94.73%	347,789	91.37%	11,140,333	95.35%
Rejected Votes	3,703	5.23%	23,124	6.08%	516,926	4.42%
Total Polled	70,743	66.62%	380,632	68.83%	11,684,111	77.66%
Registered Electors	106,183		553,009		15,044,490	

=== 2010 Sri Lankan Parliamentary Election ===
Party	Wennappuwa		Puttalam Electoral District		Sri Lanka	
Party	Votes	%	Votes	%	Votes	%
UPFA	30,075	60.38%	167,769	64.84%	4,846,388	60.38%
UNP	17,105	34.34%	81,152	31.36%	2,357,057	29.37%
DNA	2,457	4.93%	8,792	3.40%	441,251	5.50%
Other Parties (with < 1%)	172	0.35%	1,028	0.40%	33,372	0.42%
Valid Votes	49,809	93.11%	258,741	92.29%	8,026,322	96.03%
Rejected Votes	3,675	6.87%	21,562	7.69%	581,465	6.96%
Total Polled	53,495	53.62%	280,354	55.67%	8,358,246	59.29%
Registered Electors	99,774		503,635		14,097,690	

=== 2004 Sri Lankan Parliamentary Election ===
Party	Wennappuwa		Puttalam Electoral District		Sri Lanka	
Party	Votes	%	Votes	%	Votes	%
UPFA	29,042	50.13%	142,784	49.31%	4,223,126	45.70%
UNP	25,378	43.81%	135,152	46.67%	3,486,792	37.73%
JHU	3,208	5.54%	10,000	3.45%	552,723	5.98%
Other Parties (with < 1%)	303	0.52%	1,652	0.57%	62,157	0.67%
Valid Votes	57,931	94.20%	289,588	93.06%	9,241,931	94.52%
Rejected Votes	3,542	5.76%	21,431	6.89%	534,452	5.47%
Total Polled	61,495	66.15%	311,194	69.15%	9,777,821	75.74%
Registered Electors	92,966		450,057		12,909,631	

=== 2001 Sri Lankan Parliamentary Election ===
Party	Wennappuwa		Puttalam Electoral District		Sri Lanka	
Party	Votes	%	Votes	%	Votes	%
UNP	28,368	47.92%	146,873	50.61%	4,086,026	45.62%
PA	25,738	43.48%	120,981	41.69%	3,330,815	37.19%
JVP	4,023	6.80%	18,095	6.24%	815,353	9.10%
Other Parties (with < 1%)	1,067	1.80%	4,260	1.47%	116,969	1.31%
Valid Votes	59,196	95.99%	290,209	95.20%	8,955,844	94.77%
Rejected Votes	2,471	4.01%	14,638	4.80%	494,009	5.23%
Total Polled	61,667	69.92%	304,847	71.53%	9,449,878	76.03%
Registered Electors	88,194		426,193		12,428,762	

=== 2000 Sri Lankan Parliamentary Election ===
Party	Wennappuwa		Puttalam Electoral District		Sri Lanka	
Party	Votes	%	Votes	%	Votes	%
PA	29,146	50.14%	138,747	48.40%	3,899,329	45.33%
UNP	25,218	43.38%	118,566	41.36%	3,451,765	40.12%
JVP	2,596	4.47%	11,256	3.93%	518,725	6.03%
SU	618	1.06%	1,915	0.67%	127,859	1.49%
Other Parties (with < 1%)	557	0.96%	16,211	5.65%	294,065	3.42%
Valid Votes	58,135	N/A	286,695	N/A	8,602,617	N/A

=== 1994 Sri Lankan Parliamentary Election ===
Party	Wennappuwa		Puttalam Electoral District		Sri Lanka	
Party	Votes	%	Votes	%	Votes	%
PA	29,944	52.16%	150,587	53.64%	3,887,805	48.94%
UNP	26,925	46.90%	127,671	45.48%	3,498,370	44.04%
Other Parties (with < 1%)	541	0.94%	2,453	0.87%	158,616	2.00%
Valid Votes	57,410	95.65%	280,711	95.52%	7,943,688	95.20%
Rejected Votes	2,613	4.35%	13,144	4.47%	400,395	4.80%
Total Polled	60,023	76.06%	293,873	76.19%	8,344,095	74.75%
Registered Electors	78,919		385,690		11,163,064	

=== 1989 Sri Lankan Parliamentary Election ===
Party	Wennappuwa		Puttalam Electoral District		Sri Lanka	
Party	Votes	%	Votes	%	Votes	%
UNP	31,912	67.35%	139,309	62.62%	2,838,005	50.71%
SLFP	14,006	29.56%	71,687	32.22%	1,785,369	31.90%
USA	1,090	2.30%	3,398	1.53%	141,983	2.54%
Other Parties (with < 1%)	376	0.79%	8,081	3.63%	271,209	4.85%
Valid Votes	47,384	94.59%	222,475	94.40%	5,596,468	93.87%
Rejected Votes	2,712	5.41%	13,205	5.60%	365,563	6.13%
Total Polled	50,096	76.66%	235,680	73.94%	5,962,031	63.60%
Registered Electors	65,347		318,755		9,374,164	

== Demographics ==
=== Ethnicity ===
The Wennappuwa Polling Division has a Sinhalese majority (96.4%) . In comparison, the Puttalam Electoral District (which contains the Wennappuwa Polling Division) has a Sinhalese majority (73.6%) and a significant Moor population (19.4%)

Ethnicity in Wennappuwa
1. Sinhalese (96.4%)
2. Sri Lankan Tamil (2.60%)
3. Other (1.00%)

=== Religion ===
The Wennappuwa Polling Division has a Roman Catholic majority (55.2%) and a significant Buddhist population (41.3%) . In comparison, the Puttalam Electoral District (which contains the Wennappuwa Polling Division) has a Buddhist plurality (43.2%), a significant Roman Catholic population (31.5%) and a significant Muslim population (19.7%)

Religion in Wennappuwa
1. Roman Catholic (55.2%)
2. Buddhist (41.3%)
3. Other Christian (1.90%)
4. Hindu (1.20%)
5. Other (0.40%)
