= Janath Chithral Fernando =

Sri Lankan politician

Janath Chithral Fernando is a Sri Lankan politician. He was elected to the Sri Lankan Parliament from Puttalam Electoral District as a member of the Samagi Jana Balawegaya.
