= Nattandiya Polling Division =

Nattandiya
- Polling Division
- Coordinates: 7.426346°N 79.848946°E
- Country: Sri Lanka
- Province: North Western Province, Sri Lanka
- Electoral District: Puttalam Electoral District

Area
  - Total: 155.47 km^{2} (60.03 sq mi)

Population (2012)
  - Total: 113,223
  - Density: 728/km^{2} (1,890/sq mi)
- ISO 3166 code: EC-16D

The Nattandiya Polling Division is a Polling Division in the Puttalam Electoral District, in the North Western Province, Sri Lanka.

== Presidential Election Results ==
=== Summary ===
The winner of Nattandiya has matched the final country result 7 out of 8 times.

Year	Nattandiya	Puttalam Electoral District	MAE %	Sri Lanka	MAE %
2019	SLPP	SLPP	7.00%	SLPP	5.40%
2015	UPFA	NDF	3.01%	NDF	4.30%
2010	UPFA	UPFA	2.00%	UPFA	2.69%
2005	UPFA	UNP	3.79%	UPFA	1.60%
1999	PA	PA	3.71%	PA	3.25%
1994	PA	PA	0.89%	PA	0.68%
1988	UNP	UNP	2.44%	UNP	1.71%
1982	UNP	UNP	2.38%	UNP	2.72%
Matches/Mean MAE	7/8	7/8	3.15%	8/8	2.79%

=== 2019 Sri Lankan Presidential Election ===
Party	Nattandiya		Puttalam Electoral District		Sri Lanka	
Party	Votes	%	Votes	%	Votes	%
SLPP	38,832	58.02%	230,760	50.83%	6,924,255	52.25%
NDF	24,308	36.32%	199,356	43.91%	5,564,239	41.99%
NMPP	2,190	3.27%	12,912	2.84%	418,553	3.16%
Other Parties (with < 1%)	1,601	2.39%	10,948	2.41%	345,452	2.61%
Valid Votes	66,931	99.01%	453,976	99.02%	13,252,499	98.99%
Rejected Votes	668	0.99%	4,478	0.98%	135,452	1.01%
Total Polled	67,599	71.87%	458,454	76.53%	13,387,951	83.71%
Registered Electors	94,055		599,042		15,992,568	

=== 2015 Sri Lankan Presidential Election ===
Party	Nattandiya		Puttalam Electoral District		Sri Lanka	
Party	Votes	%	Votes	%	Votes	%
UPFA	33,119	52.12%	197,751	48.97%	5,768,090	47.58%
NDF	29,934	47.11%	202,073	50.04%	6,217,162	51.28%
Other Parties (with < 1%)	486	0.76%	4,026	1.00%	138,200	1.14%
Valid Votes	63,539	99.13%	403,850	98.95%	12,123,452	98.85%
Rejected Votes	558	0.87%	4,300	1.05%	140,925	1.15%
Total Polled	64,097	71.24%	408,150	72.50%	12,264,377	78.69%
Registered Electors	89,975		562,984		15,585,942	

=== 2010 Sri Lankan Presidential Election ===
Party	Nattandiya		Puttalam Electoral District		Sri Lanka	
Party	Votes	%	Votes	%	Votes	%
UPFA	34,799	60.92%	201,981	58.70%	6,015,934	57.88%
NDF	21,612	37.83%	136,233	39.59%	4,173,185	40.15%
Other Parties (with < 1%)	713	1.25%	5,899	1.71%	204,494	1.97%
Valid Votes	57,124	99.38%	344,113	99.17%	10,393,613	99.03%
Rejected Votes	355	0.62%	2,886	0.83%	101,838	0.97%
Total Polled	57,479	69.07%	346,999	68.97%	10,495,451	66.70%
Registered Electors	83,218		503,106		15,734,587	

=== 2005 Sri Lankan Presidential Election ===
Party	Nattandiya		Puttalam Electoral District		Sri Lanka	
Party	Votes	%	Votes	%	Votes	%
UPFA	29,227	52.05%	160,686	48.14%	4,887,152	50.29%
UNP	26,367	46.96%	169,264	50.71%	4,706,366	48.43%
Other Parties (with < 1%)	556	0.99%	3,833	1.15%	123,521	1.27%
Valid Votes	56,150	99.21%	333,783	98.95%	9,717,039	98.88%
Rejected Votes	445	0.79%	3,536	1.05%	109,869	1.12%
Total Polled	56,595	71.07%	337,319	70.56%	9,826,908	69.51%
Registered Electors	79,631		478,032		14,136,979	

=== 1999 Sri Lankan Presidential Election ===
Party	Nattandiya		Puttalam Electoral District		Sri Lanka	
Party	Votes	%	Votes	%	Votes	%
PA	26,152	55.53%	141,725	51.47%	4,312,157	51.12%
UNP	19,079	40.51%	121,615	44.17%	3,602,748	42.71%
JVP	1,285	2.73%	7,876	2.86%	343,927	4.08%
Other Parties (with < 1%)	576	1.22%	4,123	1.50%	176,679	2.09%
Valid Votes	47,092	98.24%	275,339	97.94%	8,435,754	97.69%
Rejected Votes	846	1.76%	5,778	2.06%	199,536	2.31%
Total Polled	47,938	69.86%	281,117	68.85%	8,635,290	72.17%
Registered Electors	68,620		408,331		11,965,536	

=== 1994 Sri Lankan Presidential Election ===
Party	Nattandiya		Puttalam Electoral District		Sri Lanka	
Party	Votes	%	Votes	%	Votes	%
PA	27,856	61.91%	165,795	62.65%	4,709,205	62.28%
UNP	16,721	37.16%	95,211	35.98%	2,715,283	35.91%
Other Parties (with < 1%)	417	0.93%	3,629	1.37%	137,040	1.81%
Valid Votes	44,994	98.74%	264,635	98.26%	7,561,526	98.03%
Rejected Votes	576	1.26%	4,689	1.74%	151,706	1.97%
Total Polled	45,570	70.71%	269,324	69.80%	7,713,232	69.12%
Registered Electors	64,449		385,854		11,158,880	

=== 1988 Sri Lankan Presidential Election ===
Party	Nattandiya		Puttalam Electoral District		Sri Lanka	
Party	Votes	%	Votes	%	Votes	%
UNP	22,194	53.31%	125,339	55.89%	2,569,199	50.43%
SLFP	18,585	44.64%	94,823	42.28%	2,289,857	44.95%
SLMP	851	2.04%	4,093	1.83%	235,701	4.63%
Valid Votes	41,630	99.08%	224,255	98.70%	5,094,754	98.24%
Rejected Votes	388	0.92%	2,965	1.30%	91,499	1.76%
Total Polled	42,018	73.04%	227,220	70.70%	5,186,256	55.87%
Registered Electors	57,526		321,387		9,283,143	

=== 1982 Sri Lankan Presidential Election ===
Party	Nattandiya		Puttalam Electoral District		Sri Lanka	
Party	Votes	%	Votes	%	Votes	%
UNP	23,324	57.14%	128,877	59.12%	3,450,815	52.93%
SLFP	16,299	39.93%	80,006	36.70%	2,546,348	39.05%
JVP	1,016	2.49%	7,001	3.21%	273,428	4.19%
Other Parties (with < 1%)	179	0.44%	2,096	0.96%	249,460	3.83%
Valid Votes	40,818	99.13%	217,980	99.09%	6,520,156	98.78%
Rejected Votes	357	0.87%	1,995	0.91%	80,470	1.22%
Total Polled	41,175	82.95%	219,975	81.41%	6,600,626	80.15%
Registered Electors	49,638		270,207		8,235,358	

== Parliamentary Election Results ==
=== Summary ===
The winner of Nattandiya has matched the final country result 7 out of 7 times.

Year	Nattandiya	Puttalam Electoral District	MAE %	Sri Lanka	MAE %
2015	UNP	UNP	3.17%	UNP	3.10%
2010	UPFA	UPFA	0.89%	UPFA	2.52%
2004	UPFA	UPFA	3.53%	UPFA	4.67%
2001	UNP	UNP	3.62%	UNP	3.61%
2000	PA	PA	2.02%	PA	3.09%
1994	PA	PA	1.30%	PA	2.98%
1989	UNP	UNP	3.66%	UNP	4.79%
Matches/Mean MAE	7/7	7/7	2.60%	7/7	3.54%

=== 2015 Sri Lankan Parliamentary Election ===
Party	Nattandiya		Puttalam Electoral District		Sri Lanka	
Party	Votes	%	Votes	%	Votes	%
UNP	27,427	48.27%	180,185	51.81%	5,098,916	45.77%
UPFA	26,714	47.02%	153,130	44.03%	4,732,664	42.48%
JVP	2,393	4.21%	12,211	3.51%	544,154	4.88%
Other Parties (with < 1%)	286	0.50%	2,263	0.65%	82,383	0.74%
Valid Votes	56,820	95.10%	347,789	91.37%	11,140,333	95.35%
Rejected Votes	2,897	4.85%	23,124	6.08%	516,926	4.42%
Total Polled	59,748	66.41%	380,632	68.83%	11,684,111	77.66%
Registered Electors	89,975		553,009		15,044,490	

=== 2010 Sri Lankan Parliamentary Election ===
Party	Nattandiya		Puttalam Electoral District		Sri Lanka	
Party	Votes	%	Votes	%	Votes	%
UPFA	27,518	64.21%	167,769	64.84%	4,846,388	60.38%
UNP	12,864	30.02%	81,152	31.36%	2,357,057	29.37%
DNA	2,246	5.24%	8,792	3.40%	441,251	5.50%
Other Parties (with < 1%)	228	0.53%	1,028	0.40%	33,372	0.42%
Valid Votes	42,856	93.12%	258,741	92.29%	8,026,322	96.03%
Rejected Votes	3,159	6.86%	21,562	7.69%	581,465	6.96%
Total Polled	46,023	55.30%	280,354	55.67%	8,358,246	59.29%
Registered Electors	83,218		503,635		14,097,690	

=== 2004 Sri Lankan Parliamentary Election ===
Party	Nattandiya		Puttalam Electoral District		Sri Lanka	
Party	Votes	%	Votes	%	Votes	%
UPFA	25,270	52.10%	142,784	49.31%	4,223,126	45.70%
UNP	20,461	42.19%	135,152	46.67%	3,486,792	37.73%
JHU	2,466	5.08%	10,000	3.45%	552,723	5.98%
Other Parties (with < 1%)	302	0.62%	1,652	0.57%	62,157	0.67%
Valid Votes	48,499	94.21%	289,588	93.06%	9,241,931	94.52%
Rejected Votes	2,953	5.74%	21,431	6.89%	534,452	5.47%
Total Polled	51,477	67.65%	311,194	69.15%	9,777,821	75.74%
Registered Electors	76,097		450,057		12,909,631	

=== 2001 Sri Lankan Parliamentary Election ===
Party	Nattandiya		Puttalam Electoral District		Sri Lanka	
Party	Votes	%	Votes	%	Votes	%
UNP	22,915	46.47%	146,873	50.61%	4,086,026	45.62%
PA	22,323	45.27%	120,981	41.69%	3,330,815	37.19%
JVP	3,345	6.78%	18,095	6.24%	815,353	9.10%
Other Parties (with < 1%)	724	1.47%	4,260	1.47%	116,969	1.31%
Valid Votes	49,307	96.39%	290,209	95.20%	8,955,844	94.77%
Rejected Votes	1,848	3.61%	14,638	4.80%	494,009	5.23%
Total Polled	51,155	70.90%	304,847	71.53%	9,449,878	76.03%
Registered Electors	72,155		426,193		12,428,762	

=== 2000 Sri Lankan Parliamentary Election ===
Party	Nattandiya		Puttalam Electoral District		Sri Lanka	
Party	Votes	%	Votes	%	Votes	%
PA	25,646	51.58%	138,747	48.40%	3,899,329	45.33%
UNP	20,078	40.38%	118,566	41.36%	3,451,765	40.12%
JVP	1,909	3.84%	11,256	3.93%	518,725	6.03%
NUA	1,308	2.63%	12,317	4.30%	185,593	2.16%
Other Parties (with < 1%)	778	1.56%	5,809	2.03%	236,331	2.75%
Valid Votes	49,719	N/A	286,695	N/A	8,602,617	N/A

=== 1994 Sri Lankan Parliamentary Election ===
Party	Nattandiya		Puttalam Electoral District		Sri Lanka	
Party	Votes	%	Votes	%	Votes	%
PA	26,286	54.93%	150,587	53.64%	3,887,805	48.94%
UNP	21,120	44.14%	127,671	45.48%	3,498,370	44.04%
Other Parties (with < 1%)	446	0.93%	2,453	0.87%	158,616	2.00%
Valid Votes	47,852	96.37%	280,711	95.52%	7,943,688	95.20%
Rejected Votes	1,804	3.63%	13,144	4.47%	400,395	4.80%
Total Polled	49,656	77.05%	293,873	76.19%	8,344,095	74.75%
Registered Electors	64,449		385,690		11,163,064	

=== 1989 Sri Lankan Parliamentary Election ===
Party	Nattandiya		Puttalam Electoral District		Sri Lanka	
Party	Votes	%	Votes	%	Votes	%
UNP	22,957	58.21%	139,309	62.62%	2,838,005	50.71%
SLFP	13,763	34.90%	71,687	32.22%	1,785,369	31.90%
SLMC	1,276	3.24%	6,253	2.81%	202,016	3.61%
USA	1,136	2.88%	3,398	1.53%	141,983	2.54%
Other Parties (with < 1%)	308	0.78%	1,828	0.82%	69,193	1.24%
Valid Votes	39,440	94.63%	222,475	94.40%	5,596,468	93.87%
Rejected Votes	2,236	5.37%	13,205	5.60%	365,563	6.13%
Total Polled	41,676	73.38%	235,680	73.94%	5,962,031	63.60%
Registered Electors	56,794		318,755		9,374,164	

== Demographics ==
=== Ethnicity ===
The Nattandiya Polling Division has a Sinhalese majority (91.4%) . In comparison, the Puttalam Electoral District (which contains the Nattandiya Polling Division) has a Sinhalese majority (73.6%) and a significant Moor population (19.4%)

Ethnicity in Nattandiya
1. Sinhalese (91.4%)
2. Moor (5.60%)
3. Sri Lankan Tamil (2.40%)
4. Other (0.50%)

=== Religion ===
The Nattandiya Polling Division has a Roman Catholic plurality (45.6%) and a significant Buddhist population (45.4%) . In comparison, the Puttalam Electoral District (which contains the Nattandiya Polling Division) has a Buddhist plurality (43.2%), a significant Roman Catholic population (31.5%) and a significant Muslim population (19.7%)

Religion in Nattandiya
1. Roman Catholic (45.6%)
2. Buddhist (45.4%)
3. Muslim (5.90%)
4. Other Christian (1.80%)
5. Hindu (1.30%)
6. Other (0.00%)
