= Puttalam Electoral District =

Electoral district in Sri Lanka

Puttalam
- Electoral District for the Parliament of Sri Lanka
- Administrative District: Puttalam
- Province: North Western
- Polling divisions: 5
- Population: 760,000 (2008)
- Electorate: 495,575 (2010)
- Area: 3,072 km^{2} (1,186 sq mi)

Current Electoral District
- Number of members: 8
- MPs: NPP (6) Chandana Abayarathna; Ajith Gihan; Gayan Janaka; Hiruni Wijesinghe; Anton Jayakody; Mohamed Faisal SJB (2) Hector Appuhamy; Janath Chithral Fernando

Puttalam electoral district is one of the 22 multi-member electoral districts of Sri Lanka created by the 1978 Constitution of Sri Lanka. The district is conterminous with the administrative district of Puttalam in the North Western province. The district currently elects 8 of the 225 members of the Sri Lankan Parliament and had 495,575 registered electors in 2010. The district is Sri Lanka's Electorate Number 16.

== Polling Divisions ==
The Puttalam Electoral District consists of the following polling divisions:

A: Puttalam

B: Anamaduwa

C: Chilaw

D: Nattandiya

E: Wennappuwa

== 1982 Presidential Election ==
Results of the 1st presidential election held on 20 October 1982 for the district:

Candidate	Party	Votes per Polling Division					Postal Votes	Total Votes	%
Candidate	Party	Anama -duwa	Chilaw	Nattan -diya	Putta -lam	Wennap -puwa	Postal Votes	Total Votes	%
Junius Jayewardene	UNP	20,789	30,142	23,324	24,089	28,801	1,732	128,877	59.12%
Hector Kobbekaduwa	SLFP	19,757	17,553	16,299	8,448	17,293	656	80,006	36.70%
Rohana Wijeweera	JVP	2,370	1,525	1,016	706	1,318	66	7,001	3.21%
Colvin R. de Silva	LSSP	182	243	119	290	171	35	1,040	0.48%
Kumar Ponnambalam	ACTC	48	109	23	592	31	14	817	0.37%
Vasudeva Nanayakkara	NSSP	72	45	37	46	33	6	239	0.11%
Valid Votes		43,218	49,617	40,818	34,171	47,647	2,509	217,980	100.00%
Rejected Votes		458	479	357	389	289	23	1,995	
Total Polled		43,676	50,096	41,175	34,560	47,936	2,532	219,975	
Registered Electors		54,207	61,128	49,638	45,817	56,885		267,675	
Turnout		80.57%	81.95%	82.95%	75.43%	84.27%		82.18%	

== 1988 Presidential Election ==
Results of the 2nd presidential election held on 19 December 1988 for the district:

Candidate	Party	Votes per Polling Division					Postal Votes	Total Votes	%
Candidate	Party	Anama -duwa	Chilaw	Nattan -diya	Putta -lam	Wennap -puwa	Postal Votes	Total Votes	%
Ranasinghe Premadasa	UNP	21,252	27,932	22,194	24,362	28,407	1,192	125,339	55.89%
Sirimavo Bandaranaike	SLFP	18,875	23,485	18,585	12,613	20,234	1,031	94,823	42.28%
Oswin Abeygunasekara	SLMP	662	748	851	815	941	76	4,093	1.83%
Valid Votes		40,789	52,165	41,630	37,790	49,582	2,299	224,255	100.00%
Rejected Votes		393	731	388	632	736	85	2,965	
Total Polled		41,182	52,896	42,018	38,422	50,318	2,384	227,220	
Registered Electors		67,553	70,574	57,526	57,106	66,244		319,003	
Turnout		60.96%	74.95%	73.04%	67.28%	75.96%		71.23%	

== 1989 Parliamentary General Election ==
Results of the 9th parliamentary election held on 15 February 1989 for the district:

Party	Votes per Polling Division					Postal Votes	Total Votes	%	Seats
Party	Anama -duwa	Chilaw	Nattan -diya	Putta -lam	Wennap -puwa	Postal Votes	Total Votes	%	Seats
United National Party	29,291	30,573	22,957	22,541	31,912	2,035	139,309	62.62%	5
Sri Lanka Freedom Party	15,208	17,456	13,763	10,331	14,006	923	71,687	32.22%	2
Sri Lanka Muslim Congress	450	699	1,276	3,661	120	47	6,253	2.81%	0
United Socialist Alliance (CPSL, LSSP, NSSP, SLMP)	505	430	1,136	150	1,090	87	3,398	1.53%	0
United Lanka People's Party	329	333	176	147	128	24	1,137	0.51%	0
Independent 2	116	162	121	74	111	0	584	0.26%	0
Independent 1	24	32	11	22	17	1	107	0.05%	0
Valid Votes	45,923	49,685	39,440	36,926	47,384	3,117	222,475	100.00%	7
Rejected Votes	2,799	2,832	2,236	2,552	2,712	74	13,205		
Total Polled	48,722	52,517	41,676	39,478	50,096	3,191	235,680		
Registered Electors	66,912	69,743	56,794	56,582	65,347	3,377	318,755		
Turnout	72.82%	75.30%	73.38%	69.77%	76.66%	94.49%	73.94%		

The following candidates were elected: Michael Festus Wenseslous Perera (UNP), 76,390 preference votes (pv); Ashoka Wadigamangawa (UNP), 56,696 pv; Harindra Jayanthi Corea (UNP), 32,899 pv; Silva Dedinuni Robert Jayaratne (SLFP), 32,567 pv; Harold Herath (UNP), 27,763 pv; Wendakoon Mudiyanselage Sujatha Kanthimathie Dharmawardana (UNP), 26,830 pv; and Milroy Fernando (SLFP), 18,375 pv.

== 1993 Provincial Council Election ==
Results of the 2nd North Western provincial council election held on 17 May 1993 for the district:

Party	Votes	%	Seats
United National Party	122,830		
People's Alliance (SLFP et al.)	89,355		
Democratic United National Front	26,203		
Nava Sama Samaja Party	3,425		
Sri Lanka Muslim Congress	3,017		
Valid Votes			
Rejected Votes			
Total Polled			
Registered Electors			
Turnout			

== 1994 Parliamentary General Election ==
Results of the 10th parliamentary election held on 16 August 1994 for the district:

Party	Votes per Polling Division					Postal Votes	Total Votes	%	Seats
Party	Anama -duwa	Chilaw	Nattan -diya	Putta -lam	Wennap -puwa	Postal Votes	Total Votes	%	Seats
People's Alliance (SLFP et al.)	32,697	31,999	26,286	26,645	29,944	3,034	150,605	53.65%	4
United National Party	25,367	29,076	21,120	23,166	26,925	2,017	127,671	45.48%	3
Sri Lanka Progressive Front (JVP)	439	356	282	150	338	50	1,615	0.58%	0
Mahajana Eksath Peramuna	128	211	164	87	203	45	838	0.30%	0
Valid Votes	58,631	61,642	47,852	50,048	57,410	5,146	280,729	100.00%	7
Rejected Votes	2,949	2,723	1,804	2,944	2,613	111	13,144		
Total Polled	61,580	64,365	49,656	52,992	60,023	5,257	293,873		
Registered Electors	80,010	83,057	64,449	73,757	78,919		380,192		
Turnout	76.97%	77.49%	77.05%	71.85%	76.06%		77.30%		

The following candidates were elected: Festus Perera (UNP), 75,417 preference votes (pv); Kachchakaduge Godfrey Joseph Fernando (PA), 55,373 pv; Jayaratne Silva Dedimuni Robert (PA), 49,116 pv; Ashoka Wadigamangawa (UNP), 47,003 pv; Milroy Fernando (PA), 43,366 pv; D. M. Dassanayake (PA), 39,793 pv; and Harold Herath (UNP), 37,538 pv.

== 1994 Presidential Election ==
Results of the 3rd presidential election held on 9 November 1994 for the district:

Candidate	Party	Votes per Polling Division					Postal Votes	Total Votes	%
Candidate	Party	Anama -duwa	Chilaw	Nattan -diya	Putta -lam	Wennap -puwa	Postal Votes	Total Votes	%
Chandrika Kumaratunga	PA	35,977	35,415	27,856	29,040	33,874	3,633	165,795	62.65%
Srimathi Dissanayake	UNP	17,821	22,240	16,721	15,542	21,004	1,883	95,211	35.98%
Hudson Samarasinghe	Ind 2	475	382	180	531	228	0	1,796	0.68%
Nihal Galappaththi	SLPF	191	130	70	118	102	14	625	0.24%
Harischandra Wijayatunga	SMBP	176	133	81	75	134	18	617	0.23%
A.J. Ranashinge	Ind 1	122	121	86	122	121	19	591	0.22%
Valid Votes		54,762	58,421	44,994	45,428	55,463	5,567	264,635	100.00%
Rejected Votes		1,045	936	576	1,043	994	95	4,689	
Total Polled		55,807	59,357	45,570	46,471	56,457	5,662	269,324	
Registered Electors		80,010	83,057	64,449	73,757	78,919		380,192	
Turnout		69.75%	71.47%	70.71%	63.01%	71.54%		70.84%	

== 1999 Provincial Council Election ==
Results of the 3rd North Western provincial council election held on 25 January 1999 for the district:

Party	Votes	%	Seats
People's Alliance (SLFP, SLMC et al.)	160,722	56.97%	8
United National Party	105,876	37.53%	6
Janatha Vimukthi Peramuna	10,759	3.81%	1
New Left Front (NSSP et al.)	3,361	1.19%	0
Muslim United Liberation Front	542	0.19%	0
Independent 2	270	0.10%	0
Liberal Party	202	0.07%	0
Independent 3	198	0.07%	0
Sri Lanka Progressive Front	126	0.04%	0
Independent 1	72	0.03%	0
Valid Votes	282,128	100.00%	15
Rejected Votes			
Total Polled			
Registered Electors	398,055		
Turnout			

== 1999 Presidential Election ==
Results of the 4th presidential election held on 21 December 1999 for the district:

Candidate	Party	Votes per Polling Division					Postal Votes	Total Votes	%
Candidate	Party	Anama -duwa	Chilaw	Nattan -diya	Putta -lam	Wennap -puwa	Postal Votes	Total Votes	%
Chandrika Kumaratunga	PA	30,542	31,998	26,152	20,842	30,149	2,042	141,725	51.47%
Ranil Wickremasinghe	UNP	22,733	26,708	19,079	26,894	24,449	1,752	121,615	44.17%
Nandana Gunathilake	JVP	2,216	1,813	1,285	701	1,583	278	7,876	2.86%
W.V.M. Ranjith	Ind 2	176	187	66	203	108	1	741	0.27%
Harischandra Wijayatunga	SMBP	131	116	111	71	166	19	614	0.22%
Rajiva Wijesinha	Liberal	195	100	69	155	80	0	599	0.22%
T. Edirisuriya	Ind 1	154	137	63	144	89	2	589	0.21%
Abdul Rasool	SLMP	58	90	96	182	48	7	481	0.17%
Vasudeva Nanayakkara	LDA	49	90	68	106	100	32	445	0.16%
Kamal Karunadasa	PLSF	87	58	48	66	48	1	308	0.11%
Hudson Samarasinghe	Ind 3	38	37	24	38	27	0	164	0.06%
A.W. Premawardhana	PFF	15	28	16	18	17	0	94	0.03%
A. Dissanayaka	DUNF	22	21	15	12	17	1	88	0.03%
Valid Votes		56,416	61,383	47,092	49,432	56,881	4,135	275,339	100.00%
Rejected Votes		1,199	1,309	846	1,202	1,076	146	5,778	
Total Polled		57,615	62,692	47,938	50,634	57,957	4,281	281,117	
Registered Electors		83,322	87,891	68,620	80,531	83,686		404,050	
Turnout		69.15%	71.33%	69.86%	62.88%	69.26%		69.57%	

== 2000 Parliamentary General Election ==
Results of the 11th parliamentary election held on 10 October 2000 for the district:

Party	Votes per Polling Division					Postal Votes	Total Votes	%	Seats
Party	Anama -duwa	Chilaw	Nattan -diya	Putta -lam	Wennap -puwa	Postal Votes	Total Votes	%	Seats
People's Alliance (SLFP et al.)	30,909	30,124	25,646	20,044	29,146	2,878	138,747	48.40%	5
United National Party	21,233	28,110	20,078	21,579	25,218	2,348	118,566	41.36%	3
National Unity Alliance (SLMC)	222	833	1,308	9,811	33	110	12,317	4.30%	0
Janatha Vimukthi Peramuna	2,843	2,558	1,909	858	2,596	492	11,256	3.93%	0
New Left Front (NSSP et al.)	587	429	220	396	317	10	1,959	0.68%	0
Sinhala Heritage	166	557	339	140	618	95	1,915	0.67%	0
Citizen's Front	80	32	89	618	42	4	865	0.30%	0
United Sinhala Great Council	96	91	40	66	46	2	341	0.12%	0
Independent 2	56	30	32	66	39	1	224	0.08%	0
Peoples Freedom Front	32	28	17	17	19	1	114	0.04%	0
Independent 1	31	21	11	21	19	0	103	0.04%	0
Independent 3	18	15	10	26	13	4	86	0.03%	0
Sri Lanka Muslim Party	10	12	7	16	15	0	60	0.02%	0
Sri Lanka Progressive Front	10	12	6	27	3	0	58	0.02%	0
National Development Front	14	3	3	11	10	1	42	0.01%	0
Ruhuna People's Party	3	26	4	8	1	0	42	0.01%	0
Valid Votes	56,310	62,881	49,719	53,704	58,135	5,946	286,695	100.00%	8
Rejected Votes	3,515	3,136	1,893	3,779	2,543	178	15,044		
Total Polled	59,825	66,017	51,612	57,483	60,678	6,124	301,739		
Registered Electors	85,002	89,650	70,028	82,077	85,717		412,474		
Turnout	70.38%	73.64%	73.70%	70.04%	70.79%		73.15%		

The following candidates were elected: Neomal Perera (UNP), 49,207 preference votes (pv); D. M. Dassanayake (PA), 45,700 pv; Festus Perera (UNP), 45,513 pv; Palitha Range Bandara (UNP), 40,296 pv; Milroy Fernando (PA), 39,943 pv; Dayasritha Thissera (PA), 38,885 pv; Piyankara Jayaratne (PA), 32,741 pv; and Ivon Sriyani Fernando (PA), 28,636 pv.

== 2001 Parliamentary General Election ==
Results of the 12th parliamentary election held on 5 December 2001 for the district:

Party	Votes per Polling Division					Postal Votes	Total Votes	%	Seats
Party	Anama -duwa	Chilaw	Nattan -diya	Putta -lam	Wennap -puwa	Postal Votes	Total Votes	%	Seats
United National Front (UNP, SLMC, CWC, WPF)	26,507	32,254	22,915	34,353	28,368		146,873	50.61%	4
People's Alliance (SLFP et al.)	25,709	27,821	22,323	17,163	25,738		120,981	41.69%	3
Janatha Vimukthi Peramuna	4,754	3,888	3,345	1,335	4,023		18,095	6.24%	0
New Left Front (NSSP et al.)	507	403	246	335	369		1,870	0.64%	0
Sinhala Heritage	90	419	363	95	532		1,545	0.53%	0
United Sinhala Great Council	49	47	23	62			230	0.08%	0
Muslim United Liberation Front	30	47	33	29			197	0.07%	0
Democratic United National Front	35	25	18	17			109	0.04%	0
National Development Front	16	17	10	7			58	0.02%	0
Independent 1	15	7	12	11			55	0.02%	0
Independent 3	12	16	4	10			53	0.02%	0
Independent 2	11	10	6	16			49	0.02%	0
Ruhuna People's Party	6	25	1	7			44	0.02%	0
Sri Lanka National Front	7	5	5	7			30	0.01%	0
Sri Lanka Progressive Front	5	2	3	7			20	0.01%	0
Valid Votes	57,753	64,986	49,307	53,454	59,196*		290,209	100.00%	7
Rejected Votes	3,030	3,142	1,848	4,017	2,471		14,638		
Total Polled	60,783	68,128	51,155	57,471	61,667		304,847		
Registered Electors	87,938	93,040	72,155	84,866	88,194		426,193		
Turnout	69.12%	73.22%	70.90%	67.72%	69.92%		71.53%		

The following candidates were elected: Palitha Range Bandara (UNF), 69,167 preference votes (pv); Neomal Perera (UNF), 59,895 pv; D. M. Dassanayake (PA), 47,100 pv; Larine Perera (UNF), 46,043 pv; Sugath Tissera (UNF), 36,218 pv; Milroy Fernando (PA), 35,121 pv; and Dayasritha Thissera (PA), 32,457 pv.

== 2004 Parliamentary General Election ==
Results of the 13th parliamentary election held on 2 April 2004 for the district:

Party	Votes per Polling Division					Postal Votes	Total Votes	%	Seats
Party	Anama -duwa	Chilaw	Nattan -diya	Putta -lam	Wennap -puwa	Postal Votes	Total Votes	%	Seats
United People's Freedom Alliance (SLFP, JVP et al.)	33,715	31,124	25,270	20,069	29,042	3,564	142,784	49.28%	5
United National Front (UNP, SLMC, CWC, WPF)	22,547	29,934	20,461	34,273	25,378	2,559	135,152	46.64%	3
Jathika Hela Urumaya	1,231	2,352	2,466	303	3,208	440	10,000	3.45%	0
National Development Front	98	205	179	147	151	5	785	0.27%	0
United Muslim People's Party	47	61	18	69	31	3	229	0.08%	0
New Left Front (NSSP et al.)	24	42	33	26	40	4	169	0.06%	0
United Socialist Party	31	26	22	37	16	0	132	0.05%	0
Independent 12	21	21	18	43	13	0	116	0.04%	0
United Lalith Front	18	19	16	13	24	2	92	0.03%	0
Swarajya	3	10	1	17	6	0	37	0.01%	0
Independent 2	6	6	7	4	6	1	30	0.01%	0
Independent 11	4	6	3	9	4	1	27	0.01%	0
Independent 6	11	3	3	4	5	0	26	0.01%	0
Independent 10	7	8	0	8	2	0	25	0.01%	0
Independent 1	4	4	4	6	5	0	23	0.01%	0
Independent 7	3	4	4	8	1	0	20	0.01%	0
Sri Lanka Progressive Front	5	3	4	6	0	0	18	0.01%	0
Sinhalaye Mahasammatha Bhoomiputra Pakshaya	1	3	3	3	7	0	17	0.01%	0
Sri Lanka Muslim Party	0	7	2	4	2	0	15	0.01%	0
Ruhuna People\'s Party	3	2	3	2	2	0	12	0.00%	0
Sri Lanka National Front	2	3	1	1	3	1	11	0.00%	0
Independent 9	1	1	0	8	0	1	11	0.00%	0
Independent 8	4	1	1	3	1	0	10	0.00%	0
Independent 3	1	1	1	2	5	0	10	0.00%	0
Independent 4	0	1	2	2	1	0	6	0.00%	0
Independent 5	2	2	2	0	0	0	6	0.00%	0
Valid Votes	57,789	63,849	48,524	55,067	57,953	6,581	289,763	100.00%	8
Rejected Votes	5,761	4,169	2,953	4,867	3,542	139	21,431		
Total Polled	63,550	68,018	51,477	59,934	61,495	6,720	311,194		
Registered Electors	92,596	98,394	76,097	90,004	92,966		450,057		
Turnout	68.63%	69.13%	67.65%	66.59%	66.15%		69.15%		

The following candidates were elected: D. M. Dassanayake (UPFA-SLFP), 55,775 preference votes (pv); P. Weerakumara Dissanayake (UPFA-JVP), 50,194 pv; Neomal Perera (UNF-UNP), 45,150 pv; Dayasritha Thissera (UPFA-SLFP), 41,190 pv; Palitha Range Bandara (UNF-UNP), 40,284 pv; Samansiri Herath (UPFA-JVP), 38,113 pv; Larine Perera (UNF-UNP), 36,846 pv; and Milroy Fernando (UPFA-SLFP), 36,545 pv.

D. M. Dassanayake (UPFA-SLFP) was murdered on 8 January 2008. His replacement Piyankara Jayaratne (UPFA-SLFP) was sworn in on 5 February 2008.

== 2004 Provincial Council Election ==
Results of the 4th North Western provincial council election held on 24 April 2004 for the district:

Party	Votes per Polling Division					Postal Votes	Total Votes	%	Seats
Party	Anama -duwa	Chilaw	Nattan -diya	Putta -lam	Wennap -puwa	Postal Votes	Total Votes	%	Seats
United People's Freedom Alliance (SLFP, JVP et al.)	29,340	29,996	22,577	20,918	23,483	2,602	128,916	57.10%	9
United National Party	19,352	20,803	13,280	24,073	16,685	1,675	95,868	42.46%	7
National Development Front	59	100	86	113	88	4	450	0.20%	0
United Muslim People's Alliance	29	25	25	59	13	1	152	0.07%	0
New Left Front (NSSP et al.)	14	16	15	8	33	3	89	0.04%	0
Independent 6	17	21	9	17	15	0	79	0.03%	0
Sinhalaye Mahasammatha Bhoomiputra Pakshaya	6	13	11	2	11	5	48	0.02%	0
Independent 5	3	17	5	8	1	0	34	0.02%	0
Independent 1	5	7	10	5	1	0	28	0.01%	0
Independent 3	0	5	0	2	13	0	20	0.01%	0
Independent 4	4	5	1	6	2	0	18	0.01%	0
Ruhuna People's Party	4	4	1	3	5	0	17	0.01%	0
Independent 2	10	0	1	3	2	0	16	0.01%	0
Sri Lanka Progressive Front	4	4	1	3	2	1	15	0.01%	0
Sri Lanka Muslim Party	4	5	1	3	2	0	15	0.01%	0
Valid Votes	48,851	51,021	36,023	45,223	40,356	4,291	225,765	100.00%	16
Rejected Votes	2,533	2,148	1,283	2,009	1,563	64	9,600		
Total Polled	51,384	53,169	37,306	47,232	41,919	4,355	235,365		
Registered Electors	92,596	98,394	76,097	90,004	92,966		450,057		
Turnout	55.49%	54.04%	49.02%	52.48%	45.09%		52.30%		

The following candidates were elected: Ashoka Wadigamangawa (UNP), 40,792 preference votes (pv); Abeyrathna Mudiyanselage Indrani Dasanayake (UPFA), 32,508 pv; Antony Victor Perera Biyanwilage (UPFA), 30,525 pv; Kurugamage Sanath Nishantha Perera (UPFA), 26,283 pv; A. S. Sisira Kumara alias W.M.P.Hemantha Sisira Kumara (UNP), 24,478 pv; Anton Prabhath Sithara (UPFA), 23,720 pv; Appuhamilage Vincent (UPFA), 23,120 pv; Piyasiri Ramanayake (UPFA), 21,805 pv; Welikumburage Saman Pushpakumara (UPFA), 19,726 pv; Jude Sumal Thissera (UPFA), 19,653 pv; Arundika Fernando (UPFA), 17,997 pv; Abdeen Ehiya Seinool (UNP), 16,438 pv; Ayoob Khan Mohomed (UNP), 14,105 pv; Gunaherath Chandrasekara Sudath Chandrasekara (UNP), 12,436 pv; Mohomed Ibrahim Bisrool Hafi (UNP), 12,273 pv; and Shahul Hameed Mohomed Niyas (UNP), 12,198 pv.

== 2005 Presidential Election ==
Results of the 5th presidential election held on 17 November 2005 for the district:

Candidate	Party	Votes per Polling Division					Postal Votes	Total Votes	%
Candidate	Party	Anama -duwa	Chilaw	Nattan -diya	Putta -lam	Wennap -puwa	Postal Votes	Total Votes	%
Ranil Wickremasinghe	UNP	30,358	37,372	26,367	40,060	32,191	2,916	169,264	50.71%
Mahinda Rajapaksa	UPFA	38,002	36,115	29,227	19,939	33,040	4,363	160,686	48.14%
Siritunga Jayasuriya	USP	202	234	131	324	169	3	1,063	0.32%
A.A. Suraweera	NDF	202	189	96	182	137	5	811	0.24%
Victor Hettigoda	ULPP	73	119	96	65	123	26	502	0.15%
Aruna de Soyza	RPP	91	59	41	55	45	1	292	0.09%
Chamil Jayaneththi	NLF	46	68	50	77	43	3	287	0.09%
Anura De Silva	ULF	47	49	33	38	47	0	214	0.06%
Wimal Geeganage	SLNF	43	50	30	36	42	2	203	0.06%
A.K.J. Arachchige	DUA	39	49	13	52	30	0	183	0.05%
Wije Dias	SEP	24	44	48	42	17	0	175	0.05%
P. Nelson Perera	SLPF	9	22	13	15	13	0	72	0.02%
H.S. Dharmadwaja	UNAF	3	8	5	6	9	0	31	0.01%
Valid Votes		69,139	74,378	56,150	60,891	65,906	7,319	333,783	100.00%
Rejected Votes		632	685	445	1,028	637	109	3,536	
Total Polled		69,771	75,063	56,595	61,919	66,543	7,428	337,319	
Registered Electors		96,744	102,987	79,631	95,350	95,892		470,604	
Turnout		72.12%	72.89%	71.07%	64.94%	69.39%		71.68%	

== 2009 Provincial Council Election ==
Results of the 5th North Western provincial council election held on 14 February 2009 for the district:

Party	Votes per Polling Division					Postal Votes	Total Votes	%	Seats
Party	Anama -duwa	Chilaw	Nattan -diya	Putta -lam	Wennap -puwa	Postal Votes	Total Votes	%	Seats
United People's Freedom Alliance (SLFP et al.)	39,996	39,789	29,367	26,753	32,186	3,286	171,377	67.48%	11
United National Party	9,236	15,647	12,315	22,667	16,092	842	76,799	30.24%	5
Janatha Vimukthi Peramuna	1,117	965	923	337	908	94	4,344	1.71%	0
United Socialist Party	51	77	49	146	58	1	382	0.15%	0
United National Alliance	32	62	45	77	48	3	267	0.11%	0
National Development Front	28	66	21	22	30	0	167	0.07%	0
Independent 12	15	27	10	15	66	1	134	0.05%	0
Socialist Equality Party	6	18	90	13	2	0	129	0.05%	0
Independent 6	3	2	9	5	29	0	48	0.02%	0
Independent 9	8	25	1	6	6	0	46	0.02%	0
Independent 1	4	12	0	4	10	0	30	0.01%	0
National People's Party	5	4	3	4	8	0	24	0.01%	0
Independent 11	3	7	3	8	3	0	24	0.01%	0
Independent 4	14	3	0	4	2	0	23	0.01%	0
Independent 2	4	6	5	4	2	0	21	0.01%	0
Patriotic National Front	6	7	2	3	2	0	20	0.01%	0
Sinhalaye Mahasammatha Bhoomiputra Pakshaya	2	4	1	0	12	0	19	0.01%	0
Independent 3	10	2	1	3	3	0	19	0.01%	0
Independent 5	1	2	4	4	6	2	19	0.01%	0
Independent 10	0	3	1	13	1	1	19	0.01%	0
Independent 7	4	2	2	7	3	0	18	0.01%	0
Independent 8	4	5	0	6	2	0	17	0.01%	0
Ruhuna People's Party	1	2	0	0	2	2	7	0.00%	0
Sri Lanka Progressive Front	2	2	1	2	0	0	7	0.00%	0
Valid Votes	50,552	56,739	42,853	50,103	49,481	4,232	253,960	100.00%	16
Rejected Votes	5,830	4,074	2,338	4,449	3,259	104	20,054		
Total Polled	56,382	60,813	45,191	54,552	52,740	4,336	274,014		
Registered Electors	100,470	107,331	82,284	100,637	99,130		489,852		
Turnout	56.12%	56.66%	54.92%	54.21%	53.20%		55.94%		

The following candidates were elected: Arundika Fernando (UPFA), 45,837 preference votes (pv); Antony Victor Perera Biyanwilage (UPFA), 42,944 pv; Abeyrathna Mudiyanselage Indrani Dasanayake (UPFA), 33,487 pv; Ashoka Wadigamangawa (UPFA), 32,277 pv; Piyasiri Ramanayake (UPFA), 30,637 pv; Kurugamage Sanath Nishantha Perera (UPFA), 29,416 pv; Jude Sumal Thissera (UPFA), 26,739 pv; Janaka Soysa (UPFA), 24,153 pv; K. R. M. Sandya Kumara Rajapaksha (UPFA), 18,812 pv; A. S. Sisira Kumara alias W.M.P.Hemantha Sisira Kumara (UNP), 17,876 pv; Malraj Pieris (UPFA), 17,756 pv; Naina Thamby Marikkar Mohammadu Thahir (UPFA), 14,733 pv; Gunaherath Chandrasekara Sudath Chandrasekara (UNP), 14,117 pv; Mihindukulasooriya Kingslylal Fernando (UNP), 14,085 pv; Appuhamy Makawita Arachchige Don Hector (UNP), 13,435 pv; and Abdeen Ehiya Seinool (UNP), 12,724 pv.

== 2010 Presidential Election ==
Results of the 6th presidential election held on 26 January 2010 for the district:

Candidate	Party	Votes per Polling Division					Postal Votes	Total Votes	%
Candidate	Party	Anama -duwa	Chilaw	Nattan -diya	Putta -lam	Wennap -puwa	Postal Votes	Total Votes	%
Mahinda Rajapaksa	UPFA	49,895	45,617	34,799	25,751	40,931	4,988	201,981	58.70%
Sarath Fonseka	NDF	19,622	29,541	21,612	36,971	26,023	2,464	136,233	39.59%
M.C.M. Ismail	DUNF	354	328	143	412	174	4	1,415	0.41%
A.A. Suraweera	NDF	264	154	88	141	119	1	767	0.22%
W.V. Mahiman Ranjith	Ind 1	209	144	86	125	101	5	670	0.19%
C.J. Sugathsiri Gamage	UDF	84	124	65	219	93	2	587	0.17%
A.S.P Liyanage	SLLP	91	96	55	73	63	2	380	0.11%
Ukkubanda Wijekoon	Ind 3	88	66	36	39	54	2	285	0.08%
Sarath Manamendra	NSH	45	63	38	86	30	1	263	0.08%
Lal Perera	ONF	49	50	31	68	48	0	246	0.07%
Siritunga Jayasuriya	USP	36	49	30	88	41	0	244	0.07%
Aithurus M. Illias	Ind 2	40	53	22	78	34	1	228	0.07%
Vikramabahu Karunaratne	LF	28	25	30	43	25	2	153	0.04%
M. K. Shivajilingam	Ind 5	27	32	12	46	12	3	132	0.04%
Wije Dias	SEP	9	30	26	29	7	1	102	0.03%
Sanath Pinnaduwa	NA	14	26	8	25	14	0	87	0.03%
M. Mohamed Musthaffa	Ind 4	9	21	9	17	10	1	67	0.02%
Senaratna de Silva	PNF	11	12	12	20	10	0	65	0.02%
Battaramulla Seelarathana	JP	8	14	2	16	21	1	62	0.02%
Sarath Kongahage	UNAF	8	11	6	19	8	0	52	0.02%
M.B. Thaminimulla	ACAKO	8	10	5	23	4	0	50	0.01%
Aruna de Soyza	RPP	7	4	9	13	11	0	44	0.01%
Valid Votes		70,906	76,470	57,124	64,302	67,833	7,478	344,113	100.00%
Rejected Votes		508	558	355	941	471	53	2,886	
Total Polled		71,414	77,028	57,479	65,243	68,304	7,531	346,999	
Registered Electors		101,696	108,244	83,218	102,643	99,774		495,575	
Turnout		70.22%	71.16%	69.07%	63.56%	68.46%		70.02%	

== 2010 Parliamentary General Election ==
Results of the 14th parliamentary election held on 8 April 2010 for the district:

Party	Votes per Polling Division					Postal Votes	Total Votes	%	Seats
Party	Anama -duwa	Chilaw	Nattan -diya	Putta -lam	Wennap -puwa	Postal Votes	Total Votes	%	Seats
United People's Freedom Alliance (SLFP et al.)	38,413	38,073	27,518	28,191	30,075	5,499	167,769	64.83%	6
United National Front (UNP, SLMC, DPF, SLFP(P))	11,109	17,555	12,864	20,961	17,105	1,558	81,152	31.36%	2
Democratic National Alliance (JVP et al.)	1,269	1,759	2,246	654	2,457	407	8,792	3.40%	0
Sri Lanka National Front	103	62	62	20	15	4	266	0.10%	0
Independent 1	6	3	58	40	47	2	156	0.06%	0
United Lanka People's Party	25	16	28	13	28	1	111	0.04%	0
United National Alternative Front	13	13	9	20	9	4	68	0.03%	0
Independent 5	7	12	14	8	9	0	50	0.02%	0
United Democratic Front	8	4	12	7	9	1	41	0.02%	0
Independent 12	7	11	3	9	9	0	39	0.02%	0
Independent 9	14	11	5	1	3	1	35	0.01%	0
Left Liberation Front	3	5	9	7	9	0	33	0.01%	0
Independent 8	8	9	4	7	3	1	32	0.01%	0
Independent 6	5	13	1	5	5	1	30	0.01%	0
Independent 4	5	6	2	4	12	0	29	0.01%	0
Independent 7	2	8	5	6	2	2	25	0.01%	0
Independent 2	4	9	5	1	3	1	23	0.01%	0
New Sinhala Heritage	2	6	2	3	6	0	19	0.01%	0
Independent 3	13	2	0	3	0	0	18	0.01%	0
United Lanka Great Council	5	2	2	6	1	0	16	0.01%	0
Independent 10	5	3	5	1	2	0	16	0.01%	0
Independent 11	3	3	2	4	2	1	15	0.01%	0
Patriotic National Front	4	5	2	0	2	1	14	0.01%	0
Sinhalaye Mahasammatha Bhoomiputra Pakshaya	2	2	2	5	1	2	14	0.01%	0
All Are Citizens, All Are Kings Organisation	5	3	0	1	2	2	13	0.01%	0
Sri Lanka Labour Party	1	0	4	3	1	0	9	0.00%	0
Janasetha Peramuna	2	1	0	1	3	0	7	0.00%	0
Valid Votes	51,043	57,596	42,864	49,981	49,820	7,488	258,792	100.00%	8
Rejected Votes	5,232	4,288	3,159	4,918	3,675	290	21,562		
Total Polled	56,275	61,884	46,023	54,899	53,495	7,778	280,354		
Registered Electors	101,696	108,244	83,218	102,643	99,774		495,575		
Turnout	55.34%	57.17%	55.30%	53.49%	53.62%		56.57%		

The following candidates were elected: Piyankara Jayaratne (UPFA-SLFP), 56,098 preference votes (pv); Arundika Fernando (UPFA), 55,889 pv; Dayasritha Thissera (UPFA-SLFP), 38,704 pv; Palitha Range Bandara (UNF-UNP), 36,861 pv; Victor Anthony Perera (UPFA), 35,259 pv; Neomal Perera (UPFA), 32,781 pv; Milroy Fernando (UPFA-SLFP), 31,509 pv; and Niroshan Perera (UNF), 28,077 pv.
