= Hiruni Wijesinghe =

Sri Lankan politician

Hon. Hiruni Wijesinghe MP
- President: Anura Kumara Dissanayake
- Prime Minister: Harini Amarasuriya

Member of Parliament for Puttalam District
- Incumbent
- Assumed office 21 November 2024
- Majority: 44,057 Preferential votes

Personal details
- Party: National People's Power
- Profession: Attorney-at-law

Hiruni Wijesinghe is a Sri Lankan politician. She was elected to the Sri Lankan Parliament from Puttalam Electoral District as a member of the National People's Power. The youngest member of the 10th parliament in Sri Lanka.
