= Anamaduwa Polling Division =

Anamaduwa
- Polling Division
- Coordinates: 7.934547°N 79.982745°E
- Country: Sri Lanka
- Province: North Western Province, Sri Lanka
- Electoral District: Puttalam Electoral District

Area
  - Total: 1,122.61 km^{2} (433.44 sq mi)

Population (2012)
  - Total: 100,650
  - Density: 90/km^{2} (230/sq mi)
- ISO 3166 code: EC-16B

The Anamaduwa Polling Division is a Polling Division in the Puttalam Electoral District, in the North Western Province, Sri Lanka.

== Presidential Election Results ==
=== Summary ===
The winner of Anamaduwa has matched the final country result 7 out of 8 times. Hence, Anamaduwa is a Strong Bellwether for Presidential Elections.

Year	Anamaduwa	Puttalam Electoral District	MAE %	Sri Lanka	MAE %
2019	SLPP	SLPP	12.26%	SLPP	10.67%
2015	UPFA	NDF	13.01%	NDF	14.29%
2010	UPFA	UPFA	11.57%	UPFA	12.24%
2005	UPFA	UNP	6.73%	UPFA	4.54%
1999	PA	PA	3.11%	PA	2.58%
1994	PA	PA	3.15%	PA	3.34%
1988	UNP	UNP	3.81%	UNP	1.58%
1982	UNP	UNP	9.90%	UNP	5.28%
Matches/Mean MAE	7/8	7/8	7.94%	8/8	6.81%

=== 2019 Sri Lankan Presidential Election ===
Party	Anamaduwa		Puttalam Electoral District		Sri Lanka	
Party	Votes	%	Votes	%	Votes	%
SLPP	60,963	64.07%	230,760	50.83%	6,924,255	52.25%
NDF	29,842	31.36%	199,356	43.91%	5,564,239	41.99%
NMPP	2,183	2.29%	12,912	2.84%	418,553	3.16%
Other Parties (with < 1%)	2,160	2.27%	10,948	2.41%	345,452	2.61%
Valid Votes	95,148	99.33%	453,976	99.02%	13,252,499	98.99%
Rejected Votes	643	0.67%	4,478	0.98%	135,452	1.01%
Total Polled	95,791	82.54%	458,454	76.53%	13,387,951	83.71%
Registered Electors	116,053		599,042		15,992,568	

=== 2015 Sri Lankan Presidential Election ===
Party	Anamaduwa		Puttalam Electoral District		Sri Lanka	
Party	Votes	%	Votes	%	Votes	%
UPFA	52,225	62.10%	197,751	48.97%	5,768,090	47.58%
NDF	31,026	36.89%	202,073	50.04%	6,217,162	51.28%
Other Parties (with < 1%)	842	1.00%	4,026	1.00%	138,200	1.14%
Valid Votes	84,093	99.08%	403,850	98.95%	12,123,452	98.85%
Rejected Votes	778	0.92%	4,300	1.05%	140,925	1.15%
Total Polled	84,871	75.12%	408,150	72.50%	12,264,377	78.69%
Registered Electors	112,978		562,984		15,585,942	

=== 2010 Sri Lankan Presidential Election ===
Party	Anamaduwa		Puttalam Electoral District		Sri Lanka	
Party	Votes	%	Votes	%	Votes	%
UPFA	49,895	70.37%	201,981	58.70%	6,015,934	57.88%
NDF	19,622	27.67%	136,233	39.59%	4,173,185	40.15%
Other Parties (with < 1%)	1,389	1.96%	5,899	1.71%	204,494	1.97%
Valid Votes	70,906	99.29%	344,113	99.17%	10,393,613	99.03%
Rejected Votes	508	0.71%	2,886	0.83%	101,838	0.97%
Total Polled	71,414	70.22%	346,999	68.97%	10,495,451	66.70%
Registered Electors	101,696		503,106		15,734,587	

=== 2005 Sri Lankan Presidential Election ===
Party	Anamaduwa		Puttalam Electoral District		Sri Lanka	
Party	Votes	%	Votes	%	Votes	%
UPFA	38,002	54.96%	160,686	48.14%	4,887,152	50.29%
UNP	30,358	43.91%	169,264	50.71%	4,706,366	48.43%
Other Parties (with < 1%)	779	1.13%	3,833	1.15%	123,521	1.27%
Valid Votes	69,139	99.09%	333,783	98.95%	9,717,039	98.88%
Rejected Votes	632	0.91%	3,536	1.05%	109,869	1.12%
Total Polled	69,771	72.12%	337,319	70.56%	9,826,908	69.51%
Registered Electors	96,744		478,032		14,136,979	

=== 1999 Sri Lankan Presidential Election ===
Party	Anamaduwa		Puttalam Electoral District		Sri Lanka	
Party	Votes	%	Votes	%	Votes	%
PA	30,542	54.14%	141,725	51.47%	4,312,157	51.12%
UNP	22,733	40.30%	121,615	44.17%	3,602,748	42.71%
JVP	2,216	3.93%	7,876	2.86%	343,927	4.08%
Other Parties (with < 1%)	925	1.64%	4,123	1.50%	176,679	2.09%
Valid Votes	56,416	97.92%	275,339	97.94%	8,435,754	97.69%
Rejected Votes	1,199	2.08%	5,778	2.06%	199,536	2.31%
Total Polled	57,615	69.15%	281,117	68.85%	8,635,290	72.17%
Registered Electors	83,322		408,331		11,965,536	

=== 1994 Sri Lankan Presidential Election ===
Party	Anamaduwa		Puttalam Electoral District		Sri Lanka	
Party	Votes	%	Votes	%	Votes	%
PA	35,977	65.70%	165,795	62.65%	4,709,205	62.28%
UNP	17,821	32.54%	95,211	35.98%	2,715,283	35.91%
Other Parties (with < 1%)	964	1.76%	3,629	1.37%	137,040	1.81%
Valid Votes	54,762	98.13%	264,635	98.26%	7,561,526	98.03%
Rejected Votes	1,045	1.87%	4,689	1.74%	151,706	1.97%
Total Polled	55,807	69.75%	269,324	69.80%	7,713,232	69.12%
Registered Electors	80,010		385,854		11,158,880	

=== 1988 Sri Lankan Presidential Election ===
Party	Anamaduwa		Puttalam Electoral District		Sri Lanka	
Party	Votes	%	Votes	%	Votes	%
UNP	21,252	52.10%	125,339	55.89%	2,569,199	50.43%
SLFP	18,875	46.27%	94,823	42.28%	2,289,857	44.95%
SLMP	662	1.62%	4,093	1.83%	235,701	4.63%
Valid Votes	40,789	99.05%	224,255	98.70%	5,094,754	98.24%
Rejected Votes	393	0.95%	2,965	1.30%	91,499	1.76%
Total Polled	41,182	60.96%	227,220	70.70%	5,186,256	55.87%
Registered Electors	67,553		321,387		9,283,143	

=== 1982 Sri Lankan Presidential Election ===
Party	Anamaduwa		Puttalam Electoral District		Sri Lanka	
Party	Votes	%	Votes	%	Votes	%
UNP	20,789	48.10%	128,877	59.12%	3,450,815	52.93%
SLFP	19,757	45.71%	80,006	36.70%	2,546,348	39.05%
JVP	2,370	5.48%	7,001	3.21%	273,428	4.19%
Other Parties (with < 1%)	302	0.70%	2,096	0.96%	249,460	3.83%
Valid Votes	43,218	98.95%	217,980	99.09%	6,520,156	98.78%
Rejected Votes	458	1.05%	1,995	0.91%	80,470	1.22%
Total Polled	43,676	80.57%	219,975	81.41%	6,600,626	80.15%
Registered Electors	54,207		270,207		8,235,358	

== Parliamentary Election Results ==
=== Summary ===
The winner of Anamaduwa has matched the final country result 6 out of 7 times. Hence, Anamaduwa is a Strong Bellwether for Parliamentary Elections.

Year	Anamaduwa	Puttalam Electoral District	MAE %	Sri Lanka	MAE %
2015	UPFA	UNP	12.51%	UNP	9.50%
2010	UPFA	UPFA	9.81%	UPFA	11.39%
2004	UPFA	UPFA	8.08%	UPFA	6.52%
2001	UNP	UNP	3.69%	UNP	2.93%
2000	PA	PA	4.87%	PA	5.42%
1994	PA	PA	2.13%	PA	3.68%
1989	UNP	UNP	1.08%	UNP	7.15%
Matches/Mean MAE	6/7	7/7	6.02%	7/7	6.66%

=== 2015 Sri Lankan Parliamentary Election ===
Party	Anamaduwa		Puttalam Electoral District		Sri Lanka	
Party	Votes	%	Votes	%	Votes	%
UPFA	42,432	57.42%	153,130	44.03%	4,732,664	42.48%
UNP	28,886	39.09%	180,185	51.81%	5,098,916	45.77%
JVP	2,159	2.92%	12,211	3.51%	544,154	4.88%
Other Parties (with < 1%)	425	0.58%	2,263	0.65%	82,383	0.74%
Valid Votes	73,902	93.21%	347,789	91.37%	11,140,333	95.35%
Rejected Votes	5,300	6.68%	23,124	6.08%	516,926	4.42%
Total Polled	79,284	70.18%	380,632	68.83%	11,684,111	77.66%
Registered Electors	112,978		553,009		15,044,490	

=== 2010 Sri Lankan Parliamentary Election ===
Party	Anamaduwa		Puttalam Electoral District		Sri Lanka	
Party	Votes	%	Votes	%	Votes	%
UPFA	38,413	75.27%	167,769	64.84%	4,846,388	60.38%
UNP	11,109	21.77%	81,152	31.36%	2,357,057	29.37%
DNA	1,269	2.49%	8,792	3.40%	441,251	5.50%
Other Parties (with < 1%)	240	0.47%	1,028	0.40%	33,372	0.42%
Valid Votes	51,031	90.68%	258,741	92.29%	8,026,322	96.03%
Rejected Votes	5,232	9.30%	21,562	7.69%	581,465	6.96%
Total Polled	56,275	55.34%	280,354	55.67%	8,358,246	59.29%
Registered Electors	101,696		503,635		14,097,690	

=== 2004 Sri Lankan Parliamentary Election ===
Party	Anamaduwa		Puttalam Electoral District		Sri Lanka	
Party	Votes	%	Votes	%	Votes	%
UPFA	33,715	58.37%	142,784	49.31%	4,223,126	45.70%
UNP	22,547	39.04%	135,152	46.67%	3,486,792	37.73%
JHU	1,231	2.13%	10,000	3.45%	552,723	5.98%
Other Parties (with < 1%)	264	0.46%	1,652	0.57%	62,157	0.67%
Valid Votes	57,757	90.88%	289,588	93.06%	9,241,931	94.52%
Rejected Votes	5,761	9.07%	21,431	6.89%	534,452	5.47%
Total Polled	63,550	68.63%	311,194	69.15%	9,777,821	75.74%
Registered Electors	92,596		450,057		12,909,631	

=== 2001 Sri Lankan Parliamentary Election ===
Party	Anamaduwa		Puttalam Electoral District		Sri Lanka	
Party	Votes	%	Votes	%	Votes	%
UNP	26,507	45.90%	146,873	50.61%	4,086,026	45.62%
PA	25,709	44.52%	120,981	41.69%	3,330,815	37.19%
JVP	4,754	8.23%	18,095	6.24%	815,353	9.10%
Other Parties (with < 1%)	783	1.36%	4,260	1.47%	116,969	1.31%
Valid Votes	57,753	95.02%	290,209	95.20%	8,955,844	94.77%
Rejected Votes	3,030	4.98%	14,638	4.80%	494,009	5.23%
Total Polled	60,783	69.12%	304,847	71.53%	9,449,878	76.03%
Registered Electors	87,938		426,193		12,428,762	

=== 2000 Sri Lankan Parliamentary Election ===
Party	Anamaduwa		Puttalam Electoral District		Sri Lanka	
Party	Votes	%	Votes	%	Votes	%
PA	30,909	54.89%	138,747	48.40%	3,899,329	45.33%
UNP	21,233	37.71%	118,566	41.36%	3,451,765	40.12%
JVP	2,843	5.05%	11,256	3.93%	518,725	6.03%
Other Parties (with < 1%)	738	1.31%	16,167	5.64%	389,649	4.53%
NLF	587	1.04%	1,959	0.68%	32,275	0.38%
Valid Votes	56,310	N/A	286,695	N/A	8,602,617	N/A

=== 1994 Sri Lankan Parliamentary Election ===
Party	Anamaduwa		Puttalam Electoral District		Sri Lanka	
Party	Votes	%	Votes	%	Votes	%
PA	32,679	55.75%	150,587	53.64%	3,887,805	48.94%
UNP	25,367	43.28%	127,671	45.48%	3,498,370	44.04%
Other Parties (with < 1%)	567	0.97%	2,453	0.87%	158,616	2.00%
Valid Votes	58,613	95.18%	280,711	95.52%	7,943,688	95.20%
Rejected Votes	2,949	4.79%	13,144	4.47%	400,395	4.80%
Total Polled	61,580	76.97%	293,873	76.19%	8,344,095	74.75%
Registered Electors	80,010		385,690		11,163,064	

=== 1989 Sri Lankan Parliamentary Election ===
Party	Anamaduwa		Puttalam Electoral District		Sri Lanka	
Party	Votes	%	Votes	%	Votes	%
UNP	29,291	63.78%	139,309	62.62%	2,838,005	50.71%
SLFP	15,208	33.12%	71,687	32.22%	1,785,369	31.90%
Other Parties (with < 1%)	919	2.00%	8,081	3.63%	271,209	4.85%
USA	505	1.10%	3,398	1.53%	141,983	2.54%
Valid Votes	45,923	94.26%	222,475	94.40%	5,596,468	93.87%
Rejected Votes	2,799	5.74%	13,205	5.60%	365,563	6.13%
Total Polled	48,722	72.82%	235,680	73.94%	5,962,031	63.60%
Registered Electors	66,912		318,755		9,374,164	

== Demographics ==
=== Ethnicity ===
The Anamaduwa Polling Division has a Sinhalese majority (94.4%) . In comparison, the Puttalam Electoral District (which contains the Anamaduwa Polling Division) has a Sinhalese majority (73.6%) and a significant Moor population (19.4%)

Ethnicity in Anamaduwa
1. Sinhalese (94.4%)
2. Moor (4.60%)
3. Other (1.00%)

=== Religion ===
The Anamaduwa Polling Division has a Buddhist majority (87.7%) . In comparison, the Puttalam Electoral District (which contains the Anamaduwa Polling Division) has a Buddhist plurality (43.2%), a significant Roman Catholic population (31.5%) and a significant Muslim population (19.7%)

Religion in Anamaduwa
1. Buddhist (87.7%)
2. Roman Catholic (6.50%)
3. Muslim (4.70%)
4. Other (1.10%)
