= Gayan Janaka =

Sri Lankan politician

Gayan Janaka is a Sri Lankan politician. He was elected to the Sri Lankan Parliament from Puttalam Electoral District as a member of the National People's Power.
