= Ministry of Civil Aviation (Sri Lanka) =

Agency overview
- Formed: 22 November 2010; 15 years ago
- Dissolved: 12 January 2015; 11 years ago
- Jurisdiction: Sri Lanka
- Employees: 121
- Annual budget: Rs 13.678,780 Billion
- Minister responsible: Piyankara Jayaratne
- Deputy Minister responsible: Gitanjana Gunawardena
- Agency executive: T. R. C. Ruberu, Secretary
- Website: aviationmin.gov.lk

The Ministry of Civil Aviation was the Sri Lankan government ministry responsible for the formulation of a more appropriate policy framework and efficient mechanisms by which to offer competitive and qualitative aviation services in order to fulfill the local and international requirements in the aviation sector.

The ministry was established on 22 November 2010 under the government of Mahinda Rajapaksa, following the separation of portfolios of the former Minstry of Ports and Aviation.

It was dissolved on 12 January 2015, as a result of Rajapaksa's defeat to Maithripala Sirisena. The control of aviation within the country is now undertaken by the Civil Aviation Authority of Sri Lanka.

Piyankara Jayaratne is the only individual who has ever served as the minister responsible for this ministry, serving from 22 November 2010 to 8 January 2015. The deputy minister was Gitanjana Gunawardena.

== List of ministers ==
Minister of Civil Aviation of Sri Lanka
- Incumbent; Vacant since 8 January 2015
- Ministry of Civil Aviation
- Appointer: President of Sri Lanka
- Term length: 5 years
- Inaugural holder: Piyankara Jayaratne
- Formation: 22 November 2010
- Final holder: Piyankara Jayaratne
- Abolished: 8 January 2015
- Website: aviationmin.gov.lk

The minister of civil aviation was an appointment in the Cabinet of Sri Lanka.

Name	Portrait	Party	Tenure	President
Piyankara Jayaratne		Sri Lanka Freedom Party	22 November 2010 – 12 January 2015	Mahinda Rajapaksa

== See also ==
- List of ministries of Sri Lanka
