= Puttalam Polling Division =

Puttalam
- Polling Division
- Coordinates: 8.231862°N 79.790144°E
- Country: Sri Lanka
- Province: North Western Province, Sri Lanka
- Electoral District: Puttalam Electoral District

Area
  - Total: 1,147.32 km^{2} (442.98 sq mi)

Population (2012)
  - Total: 186,308
  - Density: 162/km^{2} (420/sq mi)
- ISO 3166 code: EC-16A

The Puttalam Polling Division is a Polling Division in the Puttalam Electoral District, in the North Western Province, Sri Lanka.

== Presidential Election Results ==
=== Summary ===
The winner of Puttalam has matched the final country result 4 out of 8 times.

| Year | Puttalam | Puttalam Electoral District | MAE % | Sri Lanka | MAE % |
|---|---|---|---|---|---|
| 2019 | NDF | SLPP | 25.50% | SLPP | 26.91% |
| 2015 | NDF | NDF | 19.80% | NDF | 18.46% |
| 2010 | NDF | UPFA | 18.04% | UPFA | 17.29% |
| 2005 | UNP | UNP | 15.06% | UPFA | 17.23% |
| 1999 | UNP | PA | 9.36% | PA | 9.68% |
| 1994 | PA | PA | 1.44% | PA | 1.64% |
| 1988 | UNP | UNP | 8.57% | UNP | 12.39% |
| 1982 | UNP | UNP | 11.16% | UNP | 15.01% |
| Matches/Mean MAE | 4/8 | 7/8 | 13.61% | 8/8 | 14.83% |

=== 2019 Sri Lankan Presidential Election ===
| Party | Puttalam | | Puttalam Electoral District | | Sri Lanka | |
| Party | Votes | % | Votes | % | Votes | % |
|---|---|---|---|---|---|---|
| NDF | 76,385 | 71.28% | 199,356 | 43.91% | 5,564,239 | 41.99% |
| SLPP | 26,118 | 24.37% | 230,760 | 50.83% | 6,924,255 | 52.25% |
| Other Parties (with < 1%) | 2,756 | 2.57% | 10,948 | 2.41% | 345,452 | 2.61% |
| NMPP | 1,896 | 1.77% | 12,912 | 2.84% | 418,553 | 3.16% |
| Valid Votes | 107,155 | 98.82% | 453,976 | 99.02% | 13,252,499 | 98.99% |
| Rejected Votes | 1,283 | 1.18% | 4,478 | 0.98% | 135,452 | 1.01% |
| Total Polled | 108,438 | 76.15% | 458,454 | 76.53% | 13,387,951 | 83.71% |
| Registered Electors | 142,408 | | 599,042 | | 15,992,568 | |

=== 2015 Sri Lankan Presidential Election ===
| Party | Puttalam | | Puttalam Electoral District | | Sri Lanka | |
| Party | Votes | % | Votes | % | Votes | % |
|---|---|---|---|---|---|---|
| NDF | 58,844 | 69.82% | 202,073 | 50.04% | 6,217,162 | 51.28% |
| UPFA | 24,235 | 28.76% | 197,751 | 48.97% | 5,768,090 | 47.58% |
| Other Parties (with < 1%) | 1,198 | 1.42% | 4,026 | 1.00% | 138,200 | 1.14% |
| Valid Votes | 84,277 | 98.65% | 403,850 | 98.95% | 12,123,452 | 98.85% |
| Rejected Votes | 1,151 | 1.35% | 4,300 | 1.05% | 140,925 | 1.15% |
| Total Polled | 85,428 | 67.96% | 408,150 | 72.50% | 12,264,377 | 78.69% |
| Registered Electors | 125,702 | | 562,984 | | 15,585,942 | |

=== 2010 Sri Lankan Presidential Election ===
| Party | Puttalam | | Puttalam Electoral District | | Sri Lanka | |
| Party | Votes | % | Votes | % | Votes | % |
|---|---|---|---|---|---|---|
| NDF | 36,971 | 57.50% | 136,233 | 39.59% | 4,173,185 | 40.15% |
| UPFA | 25,751 | 40.05% | 201,981 | 58.70% | 6,015,934 | 57.88% |
| Other Parties (with < 1%) | 1,580 | 2.46% | 5,899 | 1.71% | 204,494 | 1.97% |
| Valid Votes | 64,302 | 98.56% | 344,113 | 99.17% | 10,393,613 | 99.03% |
| Rejected Votes | 941 | 1.44% | 2,886 | 0.83% | 101,838 | 0.97% |
| Total Polled | 65,243 | 63.56% | 346,999 | 68.97% | 10,495,451 | 66.70% |
| Registered Electors | 102,643 | | 503,106 | | 15,734,587 | |

=== 2005 Sri Lankan Presidential Election ===
| Party | Puttalam | | Puttalam Electoral District | | Sri Lanka | |
| Party | Votes | % | Votes | % | Votes | % |
|---|---|---|---|---|---|---|
| UNP | 40,060 | 65.79% | 169,264 | 50.71% | 4,706,366 | 48.43% |
| UPFA | 19,939 | 32.75% | 160,686 | 48.14% | 4,887,152 | 50.29% |
| Other Parties (with < 1%) | 892 | 1.46% | 3,833 | 1.15% | 123,521 | 1.27% |
| Valid Votes | 60,891 | 98.34% | 333,783 | 98.95% | 9,717,039 | 98.88% |
| Rejected Votes | 1,028 | 1.66% | 3,536 | 1.05% | 109,869 | 1.12% |
| Total Polled | 61,919 | 64.94% | 337,319 | 70.56% | 9,826,908 | 69.51% |
| Registered Electors | 95,350 | | 478,032 | | 14,136,979 | |

=== 1999 Sri Lankan Presidential Election ===
| Party | Puttalam | | Puttalam Electoral District | | Sri Lanka | |
| Party | Votes | % | Votes | % | Votes | % |
|---|---|---|---|---|---|---|
| UNP | 26,894 | 54.41% | 121,615 | 44.17% | 3,602,748 | 42.71% |
| PA | 20,842 | 42.16% | 141,725 | 51.47% | 4,312,157 | 51.12% |
| Other Parties (with < 1%) | 995 | 2.01% | 4,123 | 1.50% | 176,679 | 2.09% |
| JVP | 701 | 1.42% | 7,876 | 2.86% | 343,927 | 4.08% |
| Valid Votes | 49,432 | 97.63% | 275,339 | 97.94% | 8,435,754 | 97.69% |
| Rejected Votes | 1,202 | 2.37% | 5,778 | 2.06% | 199,536 | 2.31% |
| Total Polled | 50,634 | 62.88% | 281,117 | 68.85% | 8,635,290 | 72.17% |
| Registered Electors | 80,531 | | 408,331 | | 11,965,536 | |

=== 1994 Sri Lankan Presidential Election ===
| Party | Puttalam | | Puttalam Electoral District | | Sri Lanka | |
| Party | Votes | % | Votes | % | Votes | % |
|---|---|---|---|---|---|---|
| PA | 29,040 | 63.93% | 165,795 | 62.65% | 4,709,205 | 62.28% |
| UNP | 15,542 | 34.21% | 95,211 | 35.98% | 2,715,283 | 35.91% |
| Ind 2 | 531 | 1.17% | 1,796 | 0.68% | 58,888 | 0.78% |
| Other Parties (with < 1%) | 315 | 0.69% | 1,833 | 0.69% | 78,152 | 1.03% |
| Valid Votes | 45,428 | 97.76% | 264,635 | 98.26% | 7,561,526 | 98.03% |
| Rejected Votes | 1,043 | 2.24% | 4,689 | 1.74% | 151,706 | 1.97% |
| Total Polled | 46,471 | 63.01% | 269,324 | 69.80% | 7,713,232 | 69.12% |
| Registered Electors | 73,757 | | 385,854 | | 11,158,880 | |

=== 1988 Sri Lankan Presidential Election ===
| Party | Puttalam | | Puttalam Electoral District | | Sri Lanka | |
| Party | Votes | % | Votes | % | Votes | % |
|---|---|---|---|---|---|---|
| UNP | 24,362 | 64.47% | 125,339 | 55.89% | 2,569,199 | 50.43% |
| SLFP | 12,613 | 33.38% | 94,823 | 42.28% | 2,289,857 | 44.95% |
| SLMP | 815 | 2.16% | 4,093 | 1.83% | 235,701 | 4.63% |
| Valid Votes | 37,790 | 98.36% | 224,255 | 98.70% | 5,094,754 | 98.24% |
| Rejected Votes | 632 | 1.64% | 2,965 | 1.30% | 91,499 | 1.76% |
| Total Polled | 38,422 | 67.28% | 227,220 | 70.70% | 5,186,256 | 55.87% |
| Registered Electors | 57,106 | | 321,387 | | 9,283,143 | |

=== 1982 Sri Lankan Presidential Election ===
| Party | Puttalam | | Puttalam Electoral District | | Sri Lanka | |
| Party | Votes | % | Votes | % | Votes | % |
|---|---|---|---|---|---|---|
| UNP | 24,089 | 70.50% | 128,877 | 59.12% | 3,450,815 | 52.93% |
| SLFP | 8,448 | 24.72% | 80,006 | 36.70% | 2,546,348 | 39.05% |
| JVP | 706 | 2.07% | 7,001 | 3.21% | 273,428 | 4.19% |
| ACTC | 592 | 1.73% | 817 | 0.37% | 173,934 | 2.67% |
| Other Parties (with < 1%) | 336 | 0.98% | 1,279 | 0.59% | 75,526 | 1.16% |
| Valid Votes | 34,171 | 98.87% | 217,980 | 99.09% | 6,520,156 | 98.78% |
| Rejected Votes | 389 | 1.13% | 1,995 | 0.91% | 80,470 | 1.22% |
| Total Polled | 34,560 | 75.43% | 219,975 | 81.41% | 6,600,626 | 80.15% |
| Registered Electors | 45,817 | | 270,207 | | 8,235,358 | |

== Parliamentary Election Results ==
=== Summary ===
The winner of Puttalam has matched the final country result 5 out of 7 times. Hence, Puttalam is a Weak Bellwether for Parliamentary Elections.

| Year | Puttalam | Puttalam Electoral District | MAE % | Sri Lanka | MAE % |
|---|---|---|---|---|---|
| 2015 | UNP | UNP | 22.19% | UNP | 22.61% |
| 2010 | UPFA | UPFA | 8.85% | UPFA | 6.32% |
| 2004 | UNP | UPFA | 13.72% | UPFA | 13.81% |
| 2001 | UNP | UNP | 11.14% | UNP | 11.00% |
| 2000 | UNP | PA | 6.54% | PA | 4.29% |
| 1994 | PA | PA | 0.59% | PA | 3.11% |
| 1989 | UNP | UNP | 2.57% | UNP | 6.78% |
| Matches/Mean MAE | 5/7 | 7/7 | 9.37% | 7/7 | 9.70% |

=== 2015 Sri Lankan Parliamentary Election ===
| Party | Puttalam | | Puttalam Electoral District | | Sri Lanka | |
| Party | Votes | % | Votes | % | Votes | % |
|---|---|---|---|---|---|---|
| UNP | 48,466 | 75.75% | 180,185 | 51.81% | 5,098,916 | 45.77% |
| UPFA | 14,058 | 21.97% | 153,130 | 44.03% | 4,732,664 | 42.48% |
| JVP | 915 | 1.43% | 12,211 | 3.51% | 544,154 | 4.88% |
| Other Parties (with < 1%) | 540 | 0.84% | 2,263 | 0.65% | 82,383 | 0.74% |
| Valid Votes | 63,979 | 80.38% | 347,789 | 91.37% | 11,140,333 | 95.35% |
| Rejected Votes | 6,290 | 7.90% | 23,124 | 6.08% | 516,926 | 4.42% |
| Total Polled | 79,597 | 63.32% | 380,632 | 68.83% | 11,684,111 | 77.66% |
| Registered Electors | 125,702 | | 553,009 | | 15,044,490 | |

=== 2010 Sri Lankan Parliamentary Election ===
| Party | Puttalam | | Puttalam Electoral District | | Sri Lanka | |
| Party | Votes | % | Votes | % | Votes | % |
|---|---|---|---|---|---|---|
| UPFA | 28,191 | 56.42% | 167,769 | 64.84% | 4,846,388 | 60.38% |
| UNP | 20,961 | 41.95% | 81,152 | 31.36% | 2,357,057 | 29.37% |
| DNA | 654 | 1.31% | 8,792 | 3.40% | 441,251 | 5.50% |
| Other Parties (with < 1%) | 162 | 0.32% | 1,028 | 0.40% | 33,372 | 0.42% |
| Valid Votes | 49,968 | 91.02% | 258,741 | 92.29% | 8,026,322 | 96.03% |
| Rejected Votes | 4,918 | 8.96% | 21,562 | 7.69% | 581,465 | 6.96% |
| Total Polled | 54,899 | 53.49% | 280,354 | 55.67% | 8,358,246 | 59.29% |
| Registered Electors | 102,643 | | 503,635 | | 14,097,690 | |

=== 2004 Sri Lankan Parliamentary Election ===
| Party | Puttalam | | Puttalam Electoral District | | Sri Lanka | |
| Party | Votes | % | Votes | % | Votes | % |
|---|---|---|---|---|---|---|
| UNP | 34,273 | 62.31% | 135,152 | 46.67% | 3,486,792 | 37.73% |
| UPFA | 20,069 | 36.48% | 142,784 | 49.31% | 4,223,126 | 45.70% |
| Other Parties (with < 1%) | 665 | 1.21% | 11,652 | 4.02% | 614,880 | 6.65% |
| Valid Votes | 55,007 | 91.78% | 289,588 | 93.06% | 9,241,931 | 94.52% |
| Rejected Votes | 4,867 | 8.12% | 21,431 | 6.89% | 534,452 | 5.47% |
| Total Polled | 59,934 | 66.59% | 311,194 | 69.15% | 9,777,821 | 75.74% |
| Registered Electors | 90,004 | | 450,057 | | 12,909,631 | |

=== 2001 Sri Lankan Parliamentary Election ===
| Party | Puttalam | | Puttalam Electoral District | | Sri Lanka | |
| Party | Votes | % | Votes | % | Votes | % |
|---|---|---|---|---|---|---|
| UNP | 34,353 | 64.27% | 146,873 | 50.61% | 4,086,026 | 45.62% |
| PA | 17,163 | 32.11% | 120,981 | 41.69% | 3,330,815 | 37.19% |
| JVP | 1,335 | 2.50% | 18,095 | 6.24% | 815,353 | 9.10% |
| Other Parties (with < 1%) | 603 | 1.13% | 4,260 | 1.47% | 116,969 | 1.31% |
| Valid Votes | 53,454 | 93.01% | 290,209 | 95.20% | 8,955,844 | 94.77% |
| Rejected Votes | 4,017 | 6.99% | 14,638 | 4.80% | 494,009 | 5.23% |
| Total Polled | 57,471 | 67.72% | 304,847 | 71.53% | 9,449,878 | 76.03% |
| Registered Electors | 84,866 | | 426,193 | | 12,428,762 | |

=== 2000 Sri Lankan Parliamentary Election ===
| Party | Puttalam | | Puttalam Electoral District | | Sri Lanka | |
| Party | Votes | % | Votes | % | Votes | % |
|---|---|---|---|---|---|---|
| UNP | 21,579 | 40.18% | 118,566 | 41.36% | 3,451,765 | 40.12% |
| PA | 20,044 | 37.32% | 138,747 | 48.40% | 3,899,329 | 45.33% |
| NUA | 9,811 | 18.27% | 12,317 | 4.30% | 185,593 | 2.16% |
| JVP | 858 | 1.60% | 11,256 | 3.93% | 518,725 | 6.03% |
| Other Parties (with < 1%) | 794 | 1.48% | 4,944 | 1.72% | 216,501 | 2.52% |
| PP | 618 | 1.15% | 865 | 0.30% | 19,830 | 0.23% |
| Valid Votes | 53,704 | N/A | 286,695 | N/A | 8,602,617 | N/A |

=== 1994 Sri Lankan Parliamentary Election ===
| Party | Puttalam | | Puttalam Electoral District | | Sri Lanka | |
| Party | Votes | % | Votes | % | Votes | % |
|---|---|---|---|---|---|---|
| PA | 26,645 | 53.24% | 150,587 | 53.64% | 3,887,805 | 48.94% |
| UNP | 23,166 | 46.29% | 127,671 | 45.48% | 3,498,370 | 44.04% |
| Other Parties (with < 1%) | 237 | 0.47% | 2,453 | 0.87% | 158,616 | 2.00% |
| Valid Votes | 50,048 | 94.44% | 280,711 | 95.52% | 7,943,688 | 95.20% |
| Rejected Votes | 2,944 | 5.56% | 13,144 | 4.47% | 400,395 | 4.80% |
| Total Polled | 52,992 | 71.85% | 293,873 | 76.19% | 8,344,095 | 74.75% |
| Registered Electors | 73,757 | | 385,690 | | 11,163,064 | |

=== 1989 Sri Lankan Parliamentary Election ===
| Party | Puttalam | | Puttalam Electoral District | | Sri Lanka | |
| Party | Votes | % | Votes | % | Votes | % |
|---|---|---|---|---|---|---|
| UNP | 22,541 | 61.04% | 139,309 | 62.62% | 2,838,005 | 50.71% |
| SLFP | 10,331 | 27.98% | 71,687 | 32.22% | 1,785,369 | 31.90% |
| SLMC | 3,661 | 9.91% | 6,253 | 2.81% | 202,016 | 3.61% |
| Other Parties (with < 1%) | 393 | 1.06% | 5,226 | 2.35% | 211,176 | 3.77% |
| Valid Votes | 36,926 | 93.54% | 222,475 | 94.40% | 5,596,468 | 93.87% |
| Rejected Votes | 2,552 | 6.46% | 13,205 | 5.60% | 365,563 | 6.13% |
| Total Polled | 39,478 | 69.77% | 235,680 | 73.94% | 5,962,031 | 63.60% |
| Registered Electors | 56,582 | | 318,755 | | 9,374,164 | |

== Demographics ==
=== Ethnicity ===
The Puttalam Polling Division has a Moor majority (56.3%), a significant Sinhalese population (31.6%) and a significant Sri Lankan Tamil population (10.5%) . In comparison, the Puttalam Electoral District (which contains the Puttalam Polling Division) has a Sinhalese majority (73.6%) and a significant Moor population (19.4%)

Ethnicity in Puttalam
1. Moor (56.3%)
2. Sinhalese (31.6%)
3. Sri Lankan Tamil (10.5%)
4. Other (1.60%)

=== Religion ===
The Puttalam Polling Division has a Muslim majority (57.2%), a significant Roman Catholic population (21.0%) and a significant Buddhist population (14.7%) . In comparison, the Puttalam Electoral District (which contains the Puttalam Polling Division) has a Buddhist plurality (43.2%), a significant Roman Catholic population (31.5%) and a significant Muslim population (19.7%)

Religion in Puttalam
1. Muslim (57.2%)
2. Roman Catholic (21.0%)
3. Buddhist (14.7%)
4. Hindu (5.10%)
5. Other Christian (1.30%)
6. Other (0.60%)
