= Milroy Fernando =

Sri Lankan politician (born 1944)

Hon. Milroy Fernando MP

Minister of Social Services & Fishing Community Housing Development
- In office 2000–2001

Minister of Christian Affairs & Parliamentary Affairs
- In office 2004–2007

Minister of Public Estate Management & Development
- In office 2007–2010

Minister of Resettlement
- In office 2010 – 9 January 2015

Member of Parliament for Puttalam District
- In office 1989–2015

Personal details
- Born: September 9, 1944 (age 81)
- Party: Sri Lanka Freedom Party
- Other political affiliations: United People's Freedom Alliance

Warnakulasuriya Milroy Surgeus Fernando is a Sri Lankan politician, a member of the Parliament of Sri Lanka and a government minister.

== See also ==
- Cabinet of Sri Lanka
