= Neomal Perera =

Sri Lankan politician

Hon. Neomal Perera MP
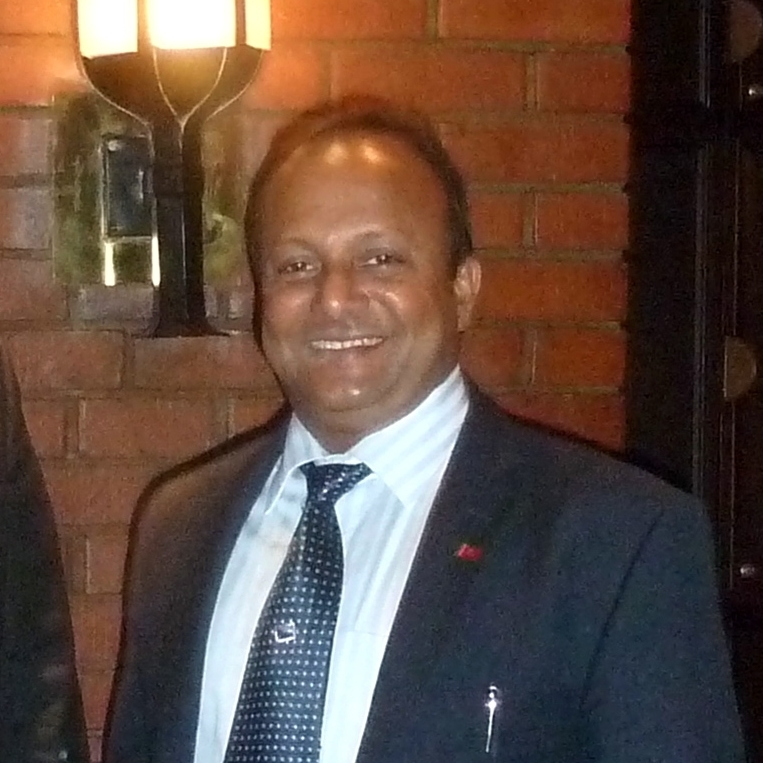

Member of Parliament for Puttalam District
- In office 2000–2015

Deputy Minister of External Affairs
- In office November 2010 – January 2015

Deputy Minister of Fisheries & Aquatic Resources
- In office January 2007 – January 2010

Deputy Minister of Co-operatives & Internal Trade
- In office April 2010 – November 2010

Personal details
- Born: 7 May 1965 (age 61)
- Party: United People's Freedom Alliance
- Other political affiliations: United National Party (Former) Sri Lanka Freedom Party
- Education: St. Joseph's College, Colombo
- Profession: Company Director

Gamamedaliyanage Joseph Lalith Neomal Perera (born May 7, 1965) is a Sri Lankan politician, a member of the Parliament of Sri Lanka and a government minister.
