= D. M. Dassanayake =

Sri Lankan politician

Dassanayake Mudiyanselage Dassanayake (Sinhala: ද. මු. දසනායක, romanized: Da. Mu. Dasssanayake; 29 April 1953 – 8 January 2008) was a Sri Lankan politician from the Puttalam District. He was serving as a member of the Parliament of Sri Lanka and non-cabinet Minister of Nation Building when he was assassinated in a roadside bomb attack on 8 January 2008 in Ja-Ela, twelve miles north of Colombo. The attack, which was blamed on the militant Tamil Tigers organization, killed three people and injured ten others.

== See also ==
- List of members of the Sri Lankan Parliament who died in office
