= Lal Chamika Buddhadasa =

Sri Lankan politician

Hon. Lal Chamika Buddhadasa MP

Member of Parliament for Badulla District

Personal details
- Born: 27 September
- Party: United People's Freedom Alliance
- Spouse: Pavithara Ranmali
- Education: St. Thomas' College, Guruthalawa

Chamika Buddhadasa MP is a Member of Parliament representing the Badulla District. He is the son of A. M. Buddhadasa (Minister of Health - Uva Provincial Council). In May 2010 he was appointed as the responsible MP for the field of Highways.

== Early life ==
He was born and raised in Welimada and Uva-Paranagama area. His father was a successful businessman and politician. He received his primary and secondary education at the St Thomas college Gurutalawa.

== Political career ==
In 2009 he was appointed as the chief SLFP of the Uva-Paranagama Electorate.
