= Manjula Dissanayake =

Sri Lankan politician

Hon. Manjula Dissanayake
- මංජුල දිසානායක மஞ்சுளா திசாநாயக்க

Member of the Parliament of Sri Lanka
- Incumbent
- Assumed office 2020
- Constituency: National List

Member of the North Western Provincial Council
- In office 2009–2018
- Constituency: Kurunegala District

Personal details
- Born: Wijekoon Mudiyanselage Manjula Wijekoon Dissanayake; 27 January 1967 (age 59)
- Party: Sri Lanka Podujana Peramuna
- Other political affiliations: Sri Lanka People's Freedom Alliance

Wijekoon Mudiyanselage Manjula Wijekoon Dissanayake (born 27 January 1967) is a Sri Lankan politician, former provincial councillor and Member of Parliament.

Dissanayake was born on 27 January 1967. She is the widow of former government minister Salinda Dissanayake. She served as her husband's private secretary. She was a member of the North Western Provincial Council. Following the 2020 parliamentary election she was appointed to the Parliament of Sri Lanka as a National List MP representing the Sri Lanka People's Freedom Alliance.

Electoral history of Manjula Dissanayake
Election	Constituency	Party	Alliance	Votes	Result
2009 provincial	Kurunegala District		United People's Freedom Alliance	47,543	Elected
2013 provincial	Kurunegala District		United People's Freedom Alliance	37,939	Elected
