= Ministry of Botanical Gardens and Public Recreation =

Government ministry of Sri Lanka

Agency overview
- Formed: 18 February 2013
- Preceding agencies: Ministry for Promotion of Botanical and Zoological Gardens; Department of Agriculture
- Dissolved: 9 January 2015
- Superseding agency: Ministry of Environment
- Jurisdiction: Sri Lanka
- Employees: 1,122
- Annual budget: Rs 1.398,715 Billion
- Minister responsible: Jayarathna Herath
- Deputy Minister responsible: Velusami Radhakrishnan
- Agency executive: W. W. Gamage, Secretary
- Child agencies: Department of National Botanical Gardens; Department of National Zoological Gardens; Sri Lanka Handicraft Board

The Ministry of Botanical Gardens and Public Recreation was a Sri Lankan government ministry established on 18 February 2013, under the gazette notification of 1798/13. It oversaw the operations of the Department of National Botanical Gardens, the Department of National Zoological Gardens, and the Sri Lanka Handicraft Board.

The predecessor of the Ministry was the creation of the Ministry for Promotion of Botanical and Zoological Gardens in 2005, which consisted of the Division of National Botanical Gardens and the Department of National Zoological Gardens. In 2006 the Department of National Botanical Gardens was established, a division under the Department of Agriculture. In 2008, the Department of Sports Development was added to the Ministry for Promotion of Botanical and Zoological Gardens, and it was renamed the Ministry of Sports and Public Recreation. In April 2010 the Departments of National Botanical Gardens and the National Zoological Gardens were placed under the jurisdiction of the Ministry of Economic Development and the Department of Sports Development was placed under the Ministry of Sports.

The Ministry was responsible for establishing the Seethawaka Botanical Garden in 2014, and the Ridiyagama Safari Park in 2016.

The Ministry was dissolved on 12 January 2015, following the election of President Maithripala Sirisena.

== List of ministers ==
Minister of Botanical Gardens and Public Recreation of Sri Lanka
- Ministry of Botanical Gardens and Public Recreation
- Deputy: Velusami Radhakrishnan

The Minister of Botanical Gardens and Public Recreation was an appointment in the Cabinet of Sri Lanka. The inaugral minister was Jayarathna Herath, who was appointed on 13 January 2013, as part of the Mahinda Rajapaksa cabinet. The deputy minister was Velusami Radhakrishnan.

Parties

Sri Lanka Freedom Party United National Party

Name	Portrait	Party	Tenure	President
Jayarathna Herath		Sri Lanka Freedom Party	28 January 2013 - 9 January 2015	Mahinda Rajapaksa

== See also ==
- List of ministries of Sri Lanka
