= Wariyapola Polling Division =

Wariyapola
- Polling Division
- Coordinates: 7.648175°N 80.252002°E
- Country: Sri Lanka
- Province: North Western Province, Sri Lanka
- Electoral District: Kurunegala Electoral District

Area
  - Total: 207.64 km^{2} (80.17 sq mi)

Population (2012)
  - Total: 61,425
  - Density: 296/km^{2} (770/sq mi)
- ISO 3166 code: EC-15E

The Wariyapola Polling Division is a Polling Division in the Kurunegala Electoral District, in the North Western Province, Sri Lanka.

== Presidential Election Results ==
=== Summary ===
The winner of Wariyapola has matched the final country result 6 out of 8 times. Hence, Wariyapola is a Weak Bellwether for Presidential Elections.

Year	Wariyapola	Kurunegala Electoral District	MAE %	Sri Lanka	MAE %
2019	SLPP	SLPP	4.70%	SLPP	9.69%
2015	UPFA	UPFA	4.45%	NDF	10.07%
2010	UPFA	UPFA	4.96%	UPFA	9.84%
2005	UPFA	UPFA	3.12%	UPFA	4.93%
1999	PA	PA	3.11%	PA	2.38%
1994	PA	PA	3.00%	PA	0.23%
1988	SLFP	UNP	2.21%	UNP	2.81%
1982	UNP	UNP	0.64%	UNP	2.46%
Matches/Mean MAE	6/8	7/8	3.27%	8/8	5.30%

=== 2019 Sri Lankan Presidential Election ===
Party	Wariyapola		Kurunegala Electoral District		Sri Lanka	
Party	Votes	%	Votes	%	Votes	%
SLPP	40,261	62.91%	652,278	57.90%	6,924,255	52.25%
NDF	20,591	32.17%	416,961	37.01%	5,564,239	41.99%
NMPP	1,984	3.10%	36,178	3.21%	418,553	3.16%
Other Parties (with < 1%)	1,163	1.82%	21,193	1.88%	345,452	2.61%
Valid Votes	63,999	99.26%	1,126,610	99.25%	13,252,499	98.99%
Rejected Votes	474	0.74%	8,522	0.75%	135,452	1.01%
Total Polled	64,473	85.51%	1,135,132	85.24%	13,387,951	83.71%
Registered Electors	75,394		1,331,705		15,992,568	

=== 2015 Sri Lankan Presidential Election ===
Party	Wariyapola		Kurunegala Electoral District		Sri Lanka	
Party	Votes	%	Votes	%	Votes	%
UPFA	34,499	57.92%	556,868	53.46%	5,768,090	47.58%
NDF	24,562	41.24%	476,602	45.76%	6,217,162	51.28%
Other Parties (with < 1%)	503	0.84%	8,154	0.78%	138,200	1.14%
Valid Votes	59,564	99.25%	1,041,624	99.12%	12,123,452	98.85%
Rejected Votes	448	0.75%	9,285	0.88%	140,925	1.15%
Total Polled	60,012	78.12%	1,050,909	78.82%	12,264,377	78.69%
Registered Electors	76,817		1,333,377		15,585,942	

=== 2010 Sri Lankan Presidential Election ===
Party	Wariyapola		Kurunegala Electoral District		Sri Lanka	
Party	Votes	%	Votes	%	Votes	%
UPFA	36,497	68.09%	582,784	63.08%	6,015,934	57.88%
NDF	16,282	30.38%	327,594	35.46%	4,173,185	40.15%
Other Parties (with < 1%)	819	1.53%	13,515	1.46%	204,494	1.97%
Valid Votes	53,598	99.36%	923,893	99.29%	10,393,613	99.03%
Rejected Votes	343	0.64%	6,644	0.71%	101,838	0.97%
Total Polled	53,941	75.02%	930,537	75.59%	10,495,451	66.70%
Registered Electors	71,905		1,230,966		15,734,587	

=== 2005 Sri Lankan Presidential Election ===
Party	Wariyapola		Kurunegala Electoral District		Sri Lanka	
Party	Votes	%	Votes	%	Votes	%
UPFA	29,155	55.41%	468,507	52.26%	4,887,152	50.29%
UNP	22,919	43.56%	418,809	46.72%	4,706,366	48.43%
Other Parties (with < 1%)	544	1.03%	9,181	1.02%	123,521	1.27%
Valid Votes	52,618	98.98%	896,497	99.07%	9,717,039	98.88%
Rejected Votes	540	1.02%	8,458	0.93%	109,869	1.12%
Total Polled	53,158	77.95%	904,955	77.87%	9,826,908	69.51%
Registered Electors	68,194		1,162,099		14,136,979	

=== 1999 Sri Lankan Presidential Election ===
Party	Wariyapola		Kurunegala Electoral District		Sri Lanka	
Party	Votes	%	Votes	%	Votes	%
PA	24,187	53.91%	377,483	50.77%	4,312,157	51.12%
UNP	18,163	40.48%	326,327	43.89%	3,602,748	42.71%
JVP	1,847	4.12%	27,354	3.68%	343,927	4.08%
Other Parties (with < 1%)	672	1.50%	12,355	1.66%	176,679	2.09%
Valid Votes	44,869	97.89%	743,519	97.99%	8,435,754	97.69%
Rejected Votes	965	2.11%	15,272	2.01%	199,536	2.31%
Total Polled	45,834	76.90%	758,791	75.83%	8,635,290	72.17%
Registered Electors	59,601		1,000,624		11,965,536	

=== 1994 Sri Lankan Presidential Election ===
Party	Wariyapola		Kurunegala Electoral District		Sri Lanka	
Party	Votes	%	Votes	%	Votes	%
PA	25,612	62.45%	403,838	59.36%	4,709,205	62.28%
UNP	14,862	36.24%	266,740	39.21%	2,715,283	35.91%
Other Parties (with < 1%)	538	1.31%	9,766	1.44%	137,040	1.81%
Valid Votes	41,012	98.53%	680,344	98.48%	7,561,526	98.03%
Rejected Votes	610	1.47%	10,511	1.52%	151,706	1.97%
Total Polled	41,622	77.68%	690,855	76.97%	7,713,232	69.12%
Registered Electors	53,579		897,539		11,158,880	

=== 1988 Sri Lankan Presidential Election ===
Party	Wariyapola		Kurunegala Electoral District		Sri Lanka	
Party	Votes	%	Votes	%	Votes	%
SLFP	10,208	49.54%	182,220	46.89%	2,289,857	44.95%
UNP	10,150	49.26%	198,662	51.12%	2,569,199	50.43%
SLMP	247	1.20%	7,717	1.99%	235,701	4.63%
Valid Votes	20,605	99.13%	388,599	98.91%	5,094,754	98.24%
Rejected Votes	181	0.87%	4,281	1.09%	91,499	1.76%
Total Polled	20,786	43.19%	392,880	53.49%	5,186,256	55.87%
Registered Electors	48,131		734,453		9,283,143	

=== 1982 Sri Lankan Presidential Election ===
Party	Wariyapola		Kurunegala Electoral District		Sri Lanka	
Party	Votes	%	Votes	%	Votes	%
UNP	21,220	56.73%	345,769	55.77%	3,450,815	52.93%
SLFP	14,914	39.87%	248,479	40.08%	2,546,348	39.05%
JVP	1,060	2.83%	21,835	3.52%	273,428	4.19%
Other Parties (with < 1%)	214	0.57%	3,895	0.63%	249,460	3.83%
Valid Votes	37,408	99.14%	619,978	99.13%	6,520,156	98.78%
Rejected Votes	325	0.86%	5,431	0.87%	80,470	1.22%
Total Polled	37,733	86.40%	625,409	86.00%	6,600,626	80.15%
Registered Electors	43,670		727,202		8,235,358	

== Parliamentary Election Results ==
=== Summary ===
The winner of Wariyapola has matched the final country result 6 out of 7 times. Hence, Wariyapola is a considered a Bellwether for Parliamentary Elections.

Year	Wariyapola	Kurunegala Electoral District	MAE %	Sri Lanka	MAE %
2015	UPFA	UPFA	3.47%	UNP	6.08%
2010	UPFA	UPFA	5.30%	UPFA	6.47%
2004	UPFA	UPFA	1.34%	UPFA	5.67%
2001	UNP	UNP	2.44%	UNP	2.78%
2000	PA	PA	0.86%	PA	2.37%
1994	PA	PA	3.54%	PA	3.46%
1989	UNP	UNP	2.15%	UNP	6.14%
Matches/Mean MAE	6/7	6/7	2.73%	7/7	4.71%

=== 2015 Sri Lankan Parliamentary Election ===
Party	Wariyapola		Kurunegala Electoral District		Sri Lanka	
Party	Votes	%	Votes	%	Votes	%
UPFA	29,038	53.18%	474,124	49.29%	4,732,664	42.48%
UNP	23,217	42.52%	441,275	45.87%	5,098,916	45.77%
JVP	2,152	3.94%	41,077	4.27%	544,154	4.88%
Other Parties (with < 1%)	196	0.36%	5,496	0.57%	83,041	0.75%
Valid Votes	54,603	95.31%	961,972	95.39%	11,140,333	95.35%
Rejected Votes	2,657	4.64%	46,036	4.56%	516,926	4.42%
Total Polled	57,289	74.58%	1,008,459	79.63%	11,684,111	77.66%
Registered Electors	76,817		1,266,443		15,044,490	

=== 2010 Sri Lankan Parliamentary Election ===
Party	Wariyapola		Kurunegala Electoral District		Sri Lanka	
Party	Votes	%	Votes	%	Votes	%
UPFA	25,701	69.58%	429,316	63.91%	4,846,388	60.38%
UNP	9,828	26.61%	213,713	31.81%	2,357,057	29.37%
DNA	1,303	3.53%	26,440	3.94%	441,251	5.50%
Other Parties (with < 1%)	104	0.28%	2,288	0.34%	34,779	0.43%
Valid Votes	36,936	92.17%	671,757	92.58%	8,026,322	96.03%
Rejected Votes	3,118	7.78%	53,130	7.32%	581,465	6.96%
Total Polled	40,073	55.73%	725,566	59.08%	8,358,246	59.29%
Registered Electors	71,905		1,228,044		14,097,690	

=== 2004 Sri Lankan Parliamentary Election ===
Party	Wariyapola		Kurunegala Electoral District		Sri Lanka	
Party	Votes	%	Votes	%	Votes	%
UPFA	24,886	53.93%	412,157	51.95%	4,223,126	45.70%
UNP	19,554	42.38%	340,768	42.95%	3,486,792	37.73%
JHU	1,569	3.40%	37,459	4.72%	552,723	5.98%
Other Parties (with < 1%)	136	0.29%	2,976	0.38%	64,640	0.70%
Valid Votes	46,145	94.61%	793,360	95.14%	9,241,931	94.52%
Rejected Votes	2,617	5.37%	40,261	4.83%	534,452	5.47%
Total Polled	48,772	74.07%	833,908	76.54%	9,777,821	75.74%
Registered Electors	65,847		1,089,482		12,909,631	

=== 2001 Sri Lankan Parliamentary Election ===
Party	Wariyapola		Kurunegala Electoral District		Sri Lanka	
Party	Votes	%	Votes	%	Votes	%
UNP	20,525	45.67%	382,768	48.59%	4,086,026	45.62%
PA	20,009	44.53%	332,775	42.24%	3,330,815	37.19%
JVP	3,960	8.81%	63,652	8.08%	815,353	9.10%
Other Parties (with < 1%)	444	0.99%	8,533	1.08%	133,770	1.49%
Valid Votes	44,938	94.29%	787,728	95.35%	8,955,844	94.77%
Rejected Votes	2,720	5.71%	38,451	4.65%	494,009	5.23%
Total Polled	47,658	75.29%	826,179	78.98%	9,449,878	76.03%
Registered Electors	63,298		1,046,102		12,428,762	

=== 2000 Sri Lankan Parliamentary Election ===
Party	Wariyapola		Kurunegala Electoral District		Sri Lanka	
Party	Votes	%	Votes	%	Votes	%
PA	21,184	47.99%	358,794	48.75%	3,899,329	45.33%
UNP	18,932	42.89%	308,106	41.86%	3,451,765	40.12%
JVP	2,709	6.14%	40,780	5.54%	518,725	6.03%
SU	664	1.50%	6,691	0.91%	127,859	1.49%
Other Parties (with < 1%)	653	1.48%	21,657	2.94%	279,248	3.25%
Valid Votes	44,142	N/A	736,028	N/A	8,602,617	N/A

=== 1994 Sri Lankan Parliamentary Election ===
Party	Wariyapola		Kurunegala Electoral District		Sri Lanka	
Party	Votes	%	Votes	%	Votes	%
PA	23,974	55.57%	366,856	51.87%	3,887,805	48.94%
UNP	18,802	43.58%	332,547	47.02%	3,498,370	44.04%
Other Parties (with < 1%)	366	0.85%	7,876	1.11%	158,616	2.00%
Valid Votes	43,142	96.04%	707,279	95.92%	7,943,688	95.20%
Rejected Votes	1,777	3.96%	30,071	4.08%	400,395	4.80%
Total Polled	44,919	83.84%	737,350	82.15%	8,344,095	74.75%
Registered Electors	53,579		897,580		11,163,064	

=== 1989 Sri Lankan Parliamentary Election ===
Party	Wariyapola		Kurunegala Electoral District		Sri Lanka	
Party	Votes	%	Votes	%	Votes	%
UNP	20,526	57.40%	314,724	58.51%	2,838,005	50.71%
SLFP	14,411	40.30%	195,526	36.35%	1,785,369	31.90%
ELJP	458	1.28%	13,759	2.56%	67,723	1.21%
Other Parties (with < 1%)	362	1.01%	13,907	2.59%	232,463	4.15%
Valid Votes	35,757	95.18%	537,916	94.02%	5,596,468	93.87%
Rejected Votes	1,811	4.82%	34,212	5.98%	365,563	6.13%
Total Polled	37,568	79.30%	572,128	72.88%	5,962,031	63.60%
Registered Electors	47,374		784,991		9,374,164	

== Demographics ==
=== Ethnicity ===
The Wariyapola Polling Division has a Sinhalese majority (98.1%) . In comparison, the Kurunegala Electoral District (which contains the Wariyapola Polling Division) has a Sinhalese majority (91.4%)

Ethnicity in Wariyapola
1. Sinhalese (98.1%)
2. Moor (1.40%)
3. Other (0.50%)

=== Religion ===
The Wariyapola Polling Division has a Buddhist majority (96.8%) . In comparison, the Kurunegala Electoral District (which contains the Wariyapola Polling Division) has a Buddhist majority (88.5%)

Religion in Wariyapola
1. Buddhist (96.8%)
2. Muslim (1.40%)
3. Roman Catholic (1.20%)
4. Other (0.50%)
