= Jayarathna Herath =

Sri Lankan politician (born 1955)

Hon. Jayarathne Herath
- ජයරත්න හේරත් ஜயரத்ன ஹேரத்
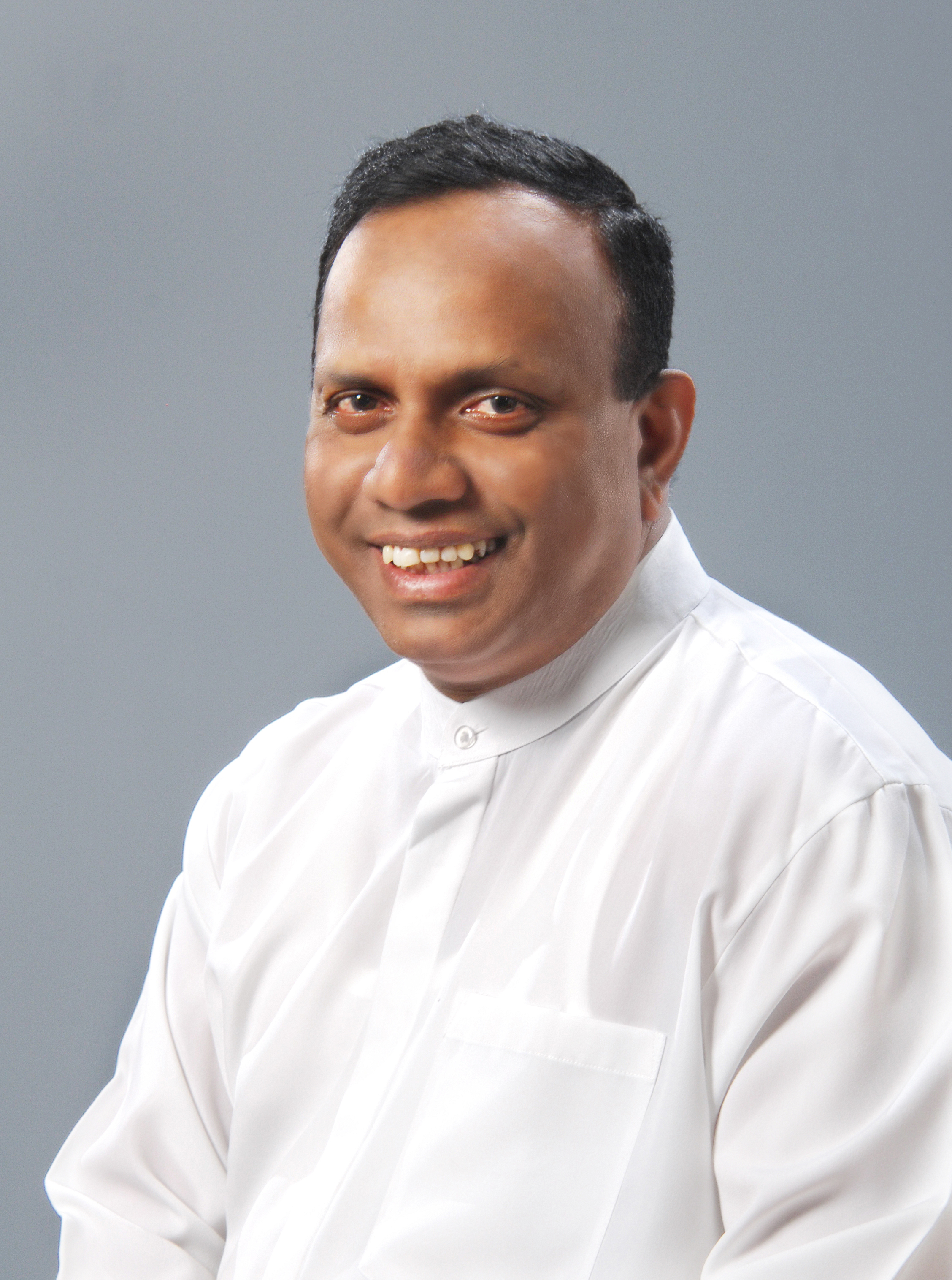

Deputy Minister of Public Security, Law & Order
- In office 2004–2007

Non-Cabinet Minister of Health Promotion & Disease Prevention
- In office 2007–2010

Deputy Minister of Industry and Commerce
- In office 2010 – 12 January 2013

Cabinet Minister of Botanical Gardens and Public Recreation
- In office 28 January 2013 – 12 January 2015

Member of Parliament for Kurunegala District
- In office 2000–2024

Personal details
- Born: 10 February 1955 (age 71)
- Party: Sri Lanka Freedom Party (before 2018); Sri Lanka Podujana Peramuna (2018–2024); Samagi Jana Balawegaya (2022–2024)
- Other political affiliations: United People's Freedom Alliance

Jayarathna Herath (born 10 February 1955) is a Sri Lankan politician, a member of the Parliament of Sri Lanka and a former government minister. He joined the Samgai Jana Balawegaya in 2022.
