= D. B. Herath =

Sri Lankan politician

Hon. D. B. Herath MP
- ඩී. බී. හේරත් தர்மசிறி பண்டார ஹேரத்

State Minister of Livestock, Farm Promotion and Dairy and Egg Related Industries
- Incumbent
- Assumed office 12 August 2020

Member of the Parliament of Sri Lanka
- Incumbent
- Assumed office 2019
- Preceded by: Salinda Dissanayake
- Constituency: Kurunegala District

Member of the North Western Provincial Council
- In office 2009–2018
- Constituency: Kurunegala District

Personal details
- Born: H. M. Dharmasiri Bandara Herath; 23 May 1956 (age 69)
- Party: Sri Lanka Podujana Peramuna
- Other political affiliations: Sri Lanka People's Freedom Alliance

H. M. Dharmasiri Bandara Herath (born 23 May 1956) is a Sri Lankan politician, Member of Parliament and state minister.

Herath was born on 23 May 1956. He was a member of the North Western Provincial Council and Minister Agriculture for the North Western Province.

He contested the 2015 parliamentary election as one of the United People's Freedom Alliance (UPFA) electoral alliance's candidates in Kurunegala District but failed to get elected after coming 10th amongst the UPFA candidates. However, following the death of Salinda Dissanayake, he was appointed to the Parliament of Sri Lanka in September 2019. He was re-elected at the 2020 parliamentary election as a Sri Lanka People's Freedom Alliance electoral alliance candidate. After the election he was appointed State Minister of Livestock, Farm Promotion and Dairy and Egg Related Industries.

Electoral history of D. B. Herath
Election	Constituency	Party	Alliance	Votes	Result
2009 provincial	Kurunegala District		United People's Freedom Alliance	43,896	Elected
2013 provincial	Kurunegala District		United People's Freedom Alliance	60,908	Elected
2015 parliamentary	Kurunegala District		United People's Freedom Alliance	42,719	Not elected
2020 parliamentary	Kurunegala District	Sri Lanka Podujana Peramuna	Sri Lanka People's Freedom Alliance	61,954	Elected
2024 parliamentary	Kurunegala District		New Democratic Front		Not elected
