= M. K. M. Aslam =

Sri Lankan politician

Hon. M. K. M. Aslam එම්. කේ. එම්. අස්ලම් எம். கே. எம். அஸ்லம் MP

Member of Parliament for Kurunegala District
- Incumbent
- Assumed office 21 November 2024

Personal details
- Born: 9 September 1979 (age 46)
- Party: Janatha Vimukthi Peramuna
- Other political affiliations: National People's Power

Mahammadu Aslam is a Sri Lankan politician and a member of the National People's Power. He was elected to the parliament in the 2024 Sri Lankan parliamentary election representing Kurunegala Electoral District. He is a businessman by profession, has a Bachelors of Laws (Hons) degree and engaged as a social activist, and a district executive committee member.

== Electoral history ==
Electoral history of M. K. M. Aslam
Election	Constituency	Party	Alliance	Votes	Result	Ref.
2024 parliamentary	Kurunegala District	JVP	NPP	67,346	Elected	
