= Dodangaslanda Polling Division =

Dodangaslanda
- Polling Division
- Coordinates: 7.516676°N 80.530144°E
- Country: Sri Lanka
- Province: North Western Province, Sri Lanka
- Electoral District: Kurunegala Electoral District

Area
  - Total: 222.9 km^{2} (86.1 sq mi)

Population (2012)
  - Total: 88,714
  - Density: 398/km^{2} (1,030/sq mi)
- ISO 3166 code: EC-15N

The Dodangaslanda Polling Division is a Polling Division in the Kurunegala Electoral District, in the North Western Province, Sri Lanka.

== Presidential Election Results ==
=== Summary ===
Since 1982, the winner in the Dodangaslanda electoral division has matched the overall national presidential election outcome in 7 of 8 elections (87.5%), making it an indicator often cited as an electoral bellwether.

Year	Dodangaslanda	Kurunegala Electoral District	MAE %	Sri Lanka	MAE %
2019	SLPP	SLPP	1.23%	SLPP	3.90%
2015	UPFA	UPFA	0.13%	NDF	5.76%
2010	UPFA	UPFA	1.95%	UPFA	2.98%
2005	UPFA	UPFA	1.04%	UPFA	2.87%
1999	PA	PA	1.39%	PA	1.05%
1994	PA	PA	1.82%	PA	4.83%
1988	UNP	UNP	4.37%	UNP	3.71%
1982	UNP	UNP	3.94%	UNP	2.73%
Matches/Mean MAE	7/8	7/8	1.98%	8/8	3.48%

=== 2019 Sri Lankan Presidential Election ===
Party	Dodangaslanda		Kurunegala Electoral District		Sri Lanka	
Party	Votes	%	Votes	%	Votes	%
SLPP	32,074	56.21%	652,278	57.90%	6,924,255	52.25%
NDF	21,489	37.66%	416,961	37.01%	5,564,239	41.99%
NMPP	2,078	3.64%	36,178	3.21%	418,553	3.16%
Other Parties (with < 1%)	1,416	2.48%	21,193	1.88%	345,452	2.61%
Valid Votes	57,057	99.06%	1,126,610	99.25%	13,252,499	98.99%
Rejected Votes	540	0.94%	8,522	0.75%	135,452	1.01%
Total Polled	57,597	83.05%	1,135,132	85.24%	13,387,951	83.71%
Registered Electors	69,356		1,331,705		15,992,568	

=== 2015 Sri Lankan Presidential Election ===
Party	Dodangaslanda		Kurunegala Electoral District		Sri Lanka	
Party	Votes	%	Votes	%	Votes	%
UPFA	28,010	53.45%	556,868	53.46%	5,768,090	47.58%
NDF	23,847	45.50%	476,602	45.76%	6,217,162	51.28%
Other Parties (with < 1%)	552	1.05%	8,154	0.78%	138,200	1.14%
Valid Votes	52,409	99.03%	1,041,624	99.12%	12,123,452	98.85%
Rejected Votes	512	0.97%	9,285	0.88%	140,925	1.15%
Total Polled	52,921	75.38%	1,050,909	78.82%	12,264,377	78.69%
Registered Electors	70,204		1,333,377		15,585,942	

=== 2010 Sri Lankan Presidential Election ===
Party	Dodangaslanda		Kurunegala Electoral District		Sri Lanka	
Party	Votes	%	Votes	%	Votes	%
UPFA	28,907	60.89%	582,784	63.08%	6,015,934	57.88%
NDF	17,596	37.07%	327,594	35.46%	4,173,185	40.15%
Other Parties (with < 1%)	968	2.04%	13,515	1.46%	204,494	1.97%
Valid Votes	47,471	99.36%	923,893	99.29%	10,393,613	99.03%
Rejected Votes	308	0.64%	6,644	0.71%	101,838	0.97%
Total Polled	47,779	72.56%	930,537	75.59%	10,495,451	66.70%
Registered Electors	65,846		1,230,966		15,734,587	

=== 2005 Sri Lankan Presidential Election ===
Party	Dodangaslanda		Kurunegala Electoral District		Sri Lanka	
Party	Votes	%	Votes	%	Votes	%
UPFA	24,658	53.15%	468,507	52.26%	4,887,152	50.29%
UNP	21,100	45.48%	418,809	46.72%	4,706,366	48.43%
Other Parties (with < 1%)	633	1.36%	9,181	1.02%	123,521	1.27%
Valid Votes	46,391	98.71%	896,497	99.07%	9,717,039	98.88%
Rejected Votes	607	1.29%	8,458	0.93%	109,869	1.12%
Total Polled	46,998	74.43%	904,955	77.87%	9,826,908	69.51%
Registered Electors	63,143		1,162,099		14,136,979	

=== 1999 Sri Lankan Presidential Election ===
Party	Dodangaslanda		Kurunegala Electoral District		Sri Lanka	
Party	Votes	%	Votes	%	Votes	%
PA	19,594	49.21%	377,483	50.77%	4,312,157	51.12%
UNP	17,011	42.72%	326,327	43.89%	3,602,748	42.71%
JVP	2,283	5.73%	27,354	3.68%	343,927	4.08%
Other Parties (with < 1%)	933	2.34%	12,355	1.66%	176,679	2.09%
Valid Votes	39,821	97.20%	743,519	97.99%	8,435,754	97.69%
Rejected Votes	1,147	2.80%	15,272	2.01%	199,536	2.31%
Total Polled	40,968	73.93%	758,791	75.83%	8,635,290	72.17%
Registered Electors	55,412		1,000,624		11,965,536	

=== 1994 Sri Lankan Presidential Election ===
Party	Dodangaslanda		Kurunegala Electoral District		Sri Lanka	
Party	Votes	%	Votes	%	Votes	%
PA	20,241	57.26%	403,838	59.36%	4,709,205	62.28%
UNP	14,374	40.66%	266,740	39.21%	2,715,283	35.91%
Other Parties (with < 1%)	735	2.08%	9,766	1.44%	137,040	1.81%
Valid Votes	35,350	98.06%	680,344	98.48%	7,561,526	98.03%
Rejected Votes	699	1.94%	10,511	1.52%	151,706	1.97%
Total Polled	36,049	73.41%	690,855	76.97%	7,713,232	69.12%
Registered Electors	49,109		897,539		11,158,880	

=== 1988 Sri Lankan Presidential Election ===
Party	Dodangaslanda		Kurunegala Electoral District		Sri Lanka	
Party	Votes	%	Votes	%	Votes	%
UNP	11,077	54.63%	198,662	51.12%	2,569,199	50.43%
SLFP	8,411	41.48%	182,220	46.89%	2,289,857	44.95%
SLMP	787	3.88%	7,717	1.99%	235,701	4.63%
Valid Votes	20,275	98.68%	388,599	98.91%	5,094,754	98.24%
Rejected Votes	271	1.32%	4,281	1.09%	91,499	1.76%
Total Polled	20,546	46.45%	392,880	53.49%	5,186,256	55.87%
Registered Electors	44,229		734,453		9,283,143	

=== 1982 Sri Lankan Presidential Election ===
Party	Dodangaslanda		Kurunegala Electoral District		Sri Lanka	
Party	Votes	%	Votes	%	Votes	%
UNP	17,538	49.70%	345,769	55.77%	3,450,815	52.93%
SLFP	14,470	41.00%	248,479	40.08%	2,546,348	39.05%
JVP	3,048	8.64%	21,835	3.52%	273,428	4.19%
Other Parties (with < 1%)	235	0.67%	3,895	0.63%	249,460	3.83%
Valid Votes	35,291	99.05%	619,978	99.13%	6,520,156	98.78%
Rejected Votes	337	0.95%	5,431	0.87%	80,470	1.22%
Total Polled	35,628	85.87%	625,409	86.00%	6,600,626	80.15%
Registered Electors	41,493		727,202		8,235,358	

== Parliamentary Election Results ==
=== Summary ===
The winner of Dodangaslanda has matched the final country result 6 out of 7 times. Hence, Dodangaslanda is a Strong Bellwether for Parliamentary Elections.

Year	Dodangaslanda	Kurunegala Electoral District	MAE %	Sri Lanka	MAE %
2015	UPFA	UPFA	0.15%	UNP	2.93%
2010	UPFA	UPFA	4.95%	UPFA	3.32%
2004	UPFA	UPFA	1.10%	UPFA	5.91%
2001	UNP	UNP	2.27%	UNP	2.56%
2000	PA	PA	1.98%	PA	0.99%
1994	PA	PA	0.90%	PA	2.46%
1989	UNP	UNP	0.65%	UNP	5.33%
Matches/Mean MAE	6/7	6/7	1.71%	7/7	3.36%

=== 2015 Sri Lankan Parliamentary Election ===
Party	Dodangaslanda		Kurunegala Electoral District		Sri Lanka	
Party	Votes	%	Votes	%	Votes	%
UPFA	23,544	49.23%	474,124	49.29%	4,732,664	42.48%
UNP	21,829	45.64%	441,275	45.87%	5,098,916	45.77%
JVP	2,237	4.68%	41,077	4.27%	544,154	4.88%
Other Parties (with < 1%)	218	0.46%	5,496	0.57%	83,041	0.75%
Valid Votes	47,828	93.66%	961,972	95.39%	11,140,333	95.35%
Rejected Votes	3,217	6.30%	46,036	4.56%	516,926	4.42%
Total Polled	51,066	72.74%	1,008,459	79.63%	11,684,111	77.66%
Registered Electors	70,204		1,266,443		15,044,490	

=== 2010 Sri Lankan Parliamentary Election ===
Party	Dodangaslanda		Kurunegala Electoral District		Sri Lanka	
Party	Votes	%	Votes	%	Votes	%
UPFA	20,217	58.86%	429,316	63.91%	4,846,388	60.38%
UNP	12,771	37.18%	213,713	31.81%	2,357,057	29.37%
DNA	1,245	3.62%	26,440	3.94%	441,251	5.50%
Other Parties (with < 1%)	116	0.34%	2,288	0.34%	34,779	0.43%
Valid Votes	34,349	90.97%	671,757	92.58%	8,026,322	96.03%
Rejected Votes	3,358	8.89%	53,130	7.32%	581,465	6.96%
Total Polled	37,758	57.34%	725,566	59.08%	8,358,246	59.29%
Registered Electors	65,846		1,228,044		14,097,690	

=== 2004 Sri Lankan Parliamentary Election ===
Party	Dodangaslanda		Kurunegala Electoral District		Sri Lanka	
Party	Votes	%	Votes	%	Votes	%
UPFA	22,426	53.65%	412,157	51.95%	4,223,126	45.70%
UNP	18,073	43.24%	340,768	42.95%	3,486,792	37.73%
JHU	1,138	2.72%	37,459	4.72%	552,723	5.98%
Other Parties (with < 1%)	163	0.39%	2,976	0.38%	64,640	0.70%
Valid Votes	41,800	93.81%	793,360	95.14%	9,241,931	94.52%
Rejected Votes	2,739	6.15%	40,261	4.83%	534,452	5.47%
Total Polled	44,557	72.18%	833,908	76.54%	9,777,821	75.74%
Registered Electors	61,727		1,089,482		12,909,631	

=== 2001 Sri Lankan Parliamentary Election ===
Party	Dodangaslanda		Kurunegala Electoral District		Sri Lanka	
Party	Votes	%	Votes	%	Votes	%
UNP	18,703	45.32%	382,768	48.59%	4,086,026	45.62%
PA	17,938	43.46%	332,775	42.24%	3,330,815	37.19%
JVP	4,147	10.05%	63,652	8.08%	815,353	9.10%
Other Parties (with < 1%)	483	1.17%	8,533	1.08%	133,770	1.49%
Valid Votes	41,271	93.82%	787,728	95.35%	8,955,844	94.77%
Rejected Votes	2,720	6.18%	38,451	4.65%	494,009	5.23%
Total Polled	43,991	74.56%	826,179	78.98%	9,449,878	76.03%
Registered Electors	58,998		1,046,102		12,428,762	

=== 2000 Sri Lankan Parliamentary Election ===
Party	Dodangaslanda		Kurunegala Electoral District		Sri Lanka	
Party	Votes	%	Votes	%	Votes	%
PA	18,208	45.15%	358,794	48.75%	3,899,329	45.33%
UNP	16,951	42.03%	308,106	41.86%	3,451,765	40.12%
JVP	3,155	7.82%	40,780	5.54%	518,725	6.03%
NUA	1,177	2.92%	11,927	1.62%	185,593	2.16%
Other Parties (with < 1%)	837	2.08%	16,421	2.23%	221,514	2.57%
Valid Votes	40,328	N/A	736,028	N/A	8,602,617	N/A

=== 1994 Sri Lankan Parliamentary Election ===
Party	Dodangaslanda		Kurunegala Electoral District		Sri Lanka	
Party	Votes	%	Votes	%	Votes	%
PA	18,300	50.71%	366,856	51.87%	3,887,805	48.94%
UNP	17,193	47.65%	332,547	47.02%	3,498,370	44.04%
SLPF	466	1.29%	4,990	0.71%	90,078	1.13%
Other Parties (with < 1%)	125	0.35%	2,886	0.41%	68,538	0.86%
Valid Votes	36,084	94.15%	707,279	95.92%	7,943,688	95.20%
Rejected Votes	2,243	5.85%	30,071	4.08%	400,395	4.80%
Total Polled	38,327	78.04%	737,350	82.15%	8,344,095	74.75%
Registered Electors	49,109		897,580		11,163,064	

=== 1989 Sri Lankan Parliamentary Election ===
Party	Dodangaslanda		Kurunegala Electoral District		Sri Lanka	
Party	Votes	%	Votes	%	Votes	%
UNP	16,774	57.86%	314,724	58.51%	2,838,005	50.71%
SLFP	10,744	37.06%	195,526	36.35%	1,785,369	31.90%
ELJP	858	2.96%	13,759	2.56%	67,723	1.21%
USA	532	1.84%	11,059	2.06%	141,983	2.54%
Other Parties (with < 1%)	82	0.28%	2,848	0.53%	90,480	1.62%
Valid Votes	28,990	92.52%	537,916	94.02%	5,596,468	93.87%
Rejected Votes	2,344	7.48%	34,212	5.98%	365,563	6.13%
Total Polled	31,334	71.75%	572,128	72.88%	5,962,031	63.60%
Registered Electors	43,674		784,991		9,374,164	

== Demographics ==
=== Ethnicity ===
The Dodangaslanda Polling Division has a Sinhalese majority (85.7%) and a significant Moor population (11.2%) . In comparison, the Kurunegala Electoral District (which contains the Dodangaslanda Polling Division) has a Sinhalese majority (91.4%)

Ethnicity in Dodangaslanda
1. Sinhalese (85.7%)
2. Moor (11.2%)
3. Sri Lankan Tamil (2.80%)
4. Other (0.40%)

=== Religion ===
The Dodangaslanda Polling Division has a Buddhist majority (85.2%) and a significant Muslim population (11.3%) . In comparison, the Kurunegala Electoral District (which contains the Dodangaslanda Polling Division) has a Buddhist majority (88.5%)

Religion in Dodangaslanda
1. Buddhist (85.2%)
2. Muslim (11.3%)
3. Hindu (2.60%)
4. Other (0.80%)
