= M. D. Namal Karunaratne =

Sri Lankan politician

Hon. Namal Karunaratne

Member of Parliament for Kurunegala District
- Incumbent
- Assumed office 21 November 2024
- Majority: 356,969 preferential votes
- In office 2004–2010

Personal details
- Born: 19 April 1968 (age 57)
- Party: Janatha Vimukthi Peramuna
- Other political affiliations: National People's Power (since 2019); United People's Freedom Alliance (2004–2005)

M. D. Namal Karunaratne (born 19 March 1968) is a Sri Lankan politician and current member of the Parliament of Sri Lanka.

On 8 March 2007, Karunaratne was appointed to a Select Committee of Parliament to look into a then-ongoing increase in traffic accidents.
