= Kurunegala Electoral District =

Electoral district in Sri Lanka

Kurunegala
- Electoral District for the Parliament of Sri Lanka
- Administrative District: Kurunegala
- Province: North Western
- Polling divisions: 14
- Population: 1,535,000 (2008)
- Electorate: 1,183,649 (2010)
- Area: 4,816 km^{2} (1,859 sq mi)

Current Electoral District
- Number of members: 15
- MPs: NPP (12) M. D. Namal Karunaratne; Ananda Wijeyapala; Sujeeva Dissanayake; Wijesiri Basnayake; Geetha Herath; Namal Sudarshana; Jagath Gunawardena; Ashoka Gunasena; G. D. Suriyabandara; Chandana Tennakoon; Dharmapriya Dissanayake; Mahammadu Aslam SJB (3) Nalin Bandara; Dayasiri Jayasekara; J. C. Alawathuwala

Kurunegala electoral district is one of the 22 multi-member electoral districts of Sri Lanka created by the 1978 Constitution of Sri Lanka. The district is conterminous with the administrative district of Kurunegala in the North Western province. The district currently elects 15 of the 225 members of the Sri Lankan Parliament and had 1,183,649 registered electors in 2010. The district is Sri Lanka's Electorate Number 15.

== Polling Divisions ==
The Kurunegala Electoral District consists of the following polling divisions:

A: Galgamuwa

B: Nikaweratiya

C: Yapahuwa

D: Hiriyala

E: Wariyapola

F: Panduwasnuwara

G: Bingiriya

H: Katugampola

I: Kuliyapitiya

J: Dambadeniya

K: Polgahawela

L: Kurunegala

M: Mawathagama

N: Dodangaslanda

== 1982 Presidential Election ==
Results of the 1st presidential election held on 20 October 1982 for the district:

Candidate	Party	Votes per Polling Division														Postal Votes	Total Votes	%
Candidate	Party	Bingi -riya	Damba- deniya	Dodan -gas- landa	Galga -muwa	Hiri- yala	Katu- gampola	Kuliya- pitiya	Kurune -gala	Mawath -agama	Nikawe -ratiya	Pandu -was- nuwara	Polgaha -wela	Wariya -pola	Yapa -huwa	Postal Votes	Total Votes	%
Junius Jayewardene	UNP	23,479	28,872	17,538	23,438	28,098	25,597	28,797	23,370	23,127	24,544	21,475	22,384	21,220	27,489	6,341	345,769	55.77%
Hector Kobbekaduwa	SLFP	19,760	19,429	14,470	20,998	15,608	21,050	19,142	14,638	16,033	17,307	14,991	16,625	14,914	20,566	2,948	248,479	40.08%
Rohana Wijeweera	JVP	742	1,897	3,048	1,882	1,496	2,003	1,247	1,300	1,580	1,262	1,048	911	1,060	2,141	218	21,835	3.52%
Colvin R. de Silva	LSSP	116	198	133	178	267	198	231	159	203	242	148	124	156	201	40	2,594	0.42%
Vasudeva Nanayakkara	NSSP	29	66	50	38	49	45	56	88	70	51	37	54	37	90	32	792	0.13%
Kumar Ponnambalam	ACTC	32	50	52	34	41	31	33	38	51	35	22	36	21	31	2	509	0.08%
Valid Votes		44,158	50,512	35,291	46,568	45,559	48,924	49,506	39,593	41,064	43,441	37,721	40,134	37,408	50,518	9,581	619,978	100.00%
Rejected Votes		257	350	337	369	580	324	391	295	435	314	384	637	325	317	116	5,431	
Total Polled		44,415	50,862	35,628	46,937	46,139	49,248	49,897	39,888	41,499	43,755	38,105	40,771	37,733	50,835	9,697	625,409	
Registered Electors		50,788	58,869	41,493	53,576	55,516	57,167	57,287	50,454	48,522	50,467	43,356	47,812	43,670	58,528		717,505	
Turnout		87.45%	86.40%	85.87%	87.61%	83.11%	86.15%	87.10%	79.06%	85.53%	86.70%	87.89%	85.27%	86.40%	86.86%		87.16%	

== 1988 Presidential Election ==
Results of the 2nd presidential election held on 19 December 1988 for the district:

Candidate	Party	Votes per Polling Division														Postal Votes	Total Votes	%
Candidate	Party	Bingi -riya	Damba- deniya	Dodan -gas- landa	Galga -muwa	Hiri- yala	Katu- gampola	Kuliya- pitiya	Kurune -gala	Mawath -agama	Nikawe -ratiya	Pandu -was- nuwara	Polgaha -wela	Wariya -pola	Yapa -huwa	Postal Votes	Total Votes	%
Ranasinghe Premadasa	UNP	18,932	21,532	11,077	12,687	12,154	15,140	18,063	13,598	20,429	11,988	11,747	13,915	10,150	7,250		198,662	51.12%
Sirimavo Bandaranaike	SLFP	19,275	16,301	8,411	13,705	8,193	13,662	17,660	11,851	17,465	9,536	12,131	15,872	10,208	7,950		182,220	46.89%
Oswin Abeygunasekara	SLMP	418	531	787	975	436	515	495	541	557	464	430	528	247	793		7,717	1.99%
Valid Votes		38,625	38,364	20,275	27,367	20,783	29,317	36,218	25,990	38,451	21,988	24,308	30,315	20,605	15,993		388,599	100.00%
Rejected Votes		336	430	271	366	214	389	338	300	380	235	259	375	181	207		4,281	
Total Polled		38,961	38,794	20,546	27,733	20,997	29,706	36,556	26,290	38,831	22,223	24,567	30,690	20,786	16,200		392,880	
Registered Electors		55,318	63,877	44,229	60,948	59,781	61,644	62,275	53,193	52,815	56,592	48,087	51,363	48,131	66,736		784,989	
Turnout		70.43%	60.73%	46.45%	45.50%	35.12%	48.19%	58.70%	49.42%	73.52%	39.27%	51.09%	59.75%	43.19%	24.27%		50.05%	

== 1989 Parliamentary General Election ==
Results of the 9th parliamentary election held on 15 February 1989 for the district:

Party	Votes per Polling Division														Postal Votes	Total Votes	%	Seats
Party	Bingi -riya	Damba- deniya	Dodan -gas- landa	Galga -muwa	Hiri- yala	Katu- gampola	Kuliya- pitiya	Kurune -gala	Mawath -agama	Nikawe -ratiya	Pandu -was- nuwara	Polgaha -wela	Wariya -pola	Yapa -huwa	Postal Votes	Total Votes	%	Seats
United National Party	22,496	28,242	16,774	20,412	25,073	25,786	24,386	21,692	22,899	19,342	16,853	19,458	20,526	23,615	7,170	314,724	58.51%	10
Sri Lanka Freedom Party	18,535	14,595	10,744	16,976	10,734	16,903	15,487	11,849	12,270	10,653	11,417	15,847	14,411	12,187	2,918	195,526	36.35%	5
United Lanka People's Party	714	994	858	1,173	610	658	1,448	1,086	1,316	1,315	1,071	1,687	458	229	142	13,759	2.56%	0
United Socialist Alliance (CPSL, LSSP, NSSP, SLMP)	208	1,305	532	1,232	275	1,043	441	508	854	1,022	272	232	238	2,707	190	11,059	2.06%	0
Mahajana Eksath Peramuna	104	188	82	311	164	219	183	284	128	437	108	250	124	177	89	2,848	0.53%	0
Valid Votes	42,057	45,324	28,990	40,104	36,856	44,609	41,945	35,419	37,467	32,769	29,721	37,474	35,757	38,915	10,509	537,916	100.00%	15
Rejected Votes	1,589	2,777	2,344	3,540	2,632	2,531	2,459	2,088	2,592	2,539	1,573	1,964	1,811	3,511	262	34,212		
Total Polled	43,646	48,101	31,334	43,644	39,488	47,140	44,404	37,507	40,059	35,308	31,294	39,438	37,568	42,426	10,771	572,128		
Registered Electors	54,522	63,024	43,674	60,359	59,043	61,031	61,316	51,885	51,935	55,823	47,509	50,258	47,374	65,948	11,290	784,991		
Turnout	80.05%	76.32%	71.75%	72.31%	66.88%	77.24%	72.42%	72.29%	77.13%	63.25%	65.87%	78.47%	79.30%	64.33%	95.40%	72.88%		

The following candidates were elected: G. M. Premachandra (UNP), 68,562 preference votes (pv); Amara Piyaseeli Ratnayake (UNP), 58,426 pv; Sarathchandra Bandara Welagedara (UNP), 44,437 pv; Upali Mervin Senarath Dasanayaka (UNP), 43,804 pv; Ariya Bandara Rekawa (UNP), 42,874 pv; Ukkubanda Wijekoon (UNP), 42,801 pv; Adikari Mudiyanselage Piyasoma Upali (UNP), 41,691 pv; S.B. Nawinne (SLFP), 38,696 pv; Wanninayaka Mudiyanselage Herath Banda Wanninayaka (UNP), 34,627 pv; Herath Mudiyanselage Ariyawardanage Lokubanda (UNP), 34,525 pv; A.M. Munidasa Premachandra (SLFP), 32,699 pv; Dissanayaka Mudiyanselage Bandaranayaka (UNP), 31,788 pv; Diunugallage Peter Wickramasinghe (SLFP), 31,609 pv; Lionel Rajapaksa (SLFP), 31,419 pv; and Jayasena Rajakaruna (SLFP), 30,346 pv.

== 1993 Provincial Council Election ==
Results of the 2nd North Western provincial council election held on 17 May 1993 for the district:

Party	Votes	%	Seats
United National Party	269,768		15
People's Alliance (SLFP et al.)	221,896		13
Democratic United National Front	117,893		7
Nava Sama Samaja Party	5,117		0
Sri Lanka Muslim Congress	4,159		0
Valid Votes	618,833		35
Rejected Votes	43,706		
Total Polled	662,539		
Registered Electors	858,638		
Turnout			

== 1994 Parliamentary General Election ==
Results of the 10th parliamentary election held on 16 August 1994 for the district:

Party	Votes per Polling Division														Postal Votes	Total Votes	%	Seats
Party	Bingi -riya	Damba- deniya	Dodan -gas- landa	Galga -muwa	Hiri- yala	Katu- gampola	Kuliya- pitiya	Kurune -gala	Mawath -agama	Nikawe -ratiya	Pandu -was- nuwara	Polgaha -wela	Wariya -pola	Yapa -huwa	Postal Votes	Total Votes	%	Seats
People's Alliance (SLFP et al.)	25,709	28,551	18,300	31,870	23,984	30,192	27,109	22,173	23,746	28,351	21,295	20,829	23,974	30,277	10,496	366,856	51.87%	8
United National Party	23,502	26,223	17,193	23,996	26,181	23,922	27,173	22,042	21,805	22,471	20,011	22,167	18,802	28,549	8,510	332,547	47.02%	7
Sri Lanka Progressive Front (JVP)	213	277	466	496	311	442	272	334	491	251	189	263	241	583	161	4,990	0.71%	0
Mahajana Eksath Peramuna	178	204	125	218	191	223	347	230	204	134	137	274	125	107	189	2,886	0.41%	0
Valid Votes	49,602	55,255	36,084	56,580	50,667	54,779	54,901	44,779	46,246	51,207	41,632	43,533	43,142	59,516	19,356	707,279	100.00%	15
Rejected Votes	1,441	2,013	2,243	2,329	2,817	2,235	2,229	1,947	1,752	2,365	1,747	1,745	1,777	3,041	390	30,071		
Total Polled	51,043	57,268	38,327	58,909	53,484	57,014	57,130	46,726	47,998	53,572	43,379	45,278	44,919	62,557	19,746	737,350		
Registered Electors	61,107	69,064	49,109	69,872	67,182	68,616	69,233	59,146	60,627	64,434	52,667	55,872	53,579	76,083		876,591		
Turnout	83.53%	82.92%	78.04%	84.31%	79.61%	83.09%	82.52%	79.00%	79.17%	83.14%	82.36%	81.04%	83.84%	82.22%		84.12%		

The following candidates were elected: S.B. Nawinne (PA), 122,611 preference votes (pv); Gamini Jayawickrama Perera (UNP), 109,900 pv; T. B. Ekanayake (PA), 59,313 pv; A.M. Munidasa Premachandra (PA), 58,293 pv; Salinda Dissanayake (PA), 57,641 pv; Anura Priyadharshana Yapa (PA), 57,127 pv; Bandula Basnayake (PA), 56,609 pv; Adikari Mudiyanselage Piyasoma Upali (UNP), 54,881 pv; Amara Piyaseeli Ratnayake (UNP), 53,421 pv; Ahamad Hasan Mohamad Alavi (UNP), 52,381 pv; Alawatuwala Jayadeva Chandrawansha (UNP), 51,691 pv; Dissanayake Mudiyanselage Bandaranayake (UNP), 50,901 pv; Herath Mudiyanselaage Ariyawaardhanage Loku Banda (UNP), 50,535 pv; Diyunugalge Peter Wickramasinghe (PA), 49,383 pv; and R.M. Jayasena Rajakaruna (PA), 47,073 pv.

== 1994 Presidential Election ==
Results of the 3rd presidential election held on 9 November 1994 for the district:

Candidate	Party	Votes per Polling Division														Postal Votes	Total Votes	%
Candidate	Party	Bingi -riya	Damba- deniya	Dodan -gas- landa	Galga -muwa	Hiri- yala	Katu- gampola	Kuliya- pitiya	Kurune -gala	Mawath -agama	Nikawe -ratiya	Pandu -was- nuwara	Polgaha -wela	Wariya -pola	Yapa -huwa	Postal Votes	Total Votes	%
Chandrika Kumaratunga	PA	27,377	30,516	20,241	33,011	28,159	33,528	29,638	24,685	28,057	30,415	23,158	23,447	25,612	33,582	12,412	403,838	59.36%
Srimathi Dissanayake	UNP	19,915	20,613	14,374	19,033	20,880	19,095	22,999	17,005	16,635	17,932	15,482	17,030	14,862	22,893	7,992	266,740	39.21%
Hudson Samarasinghe	Ind 2	233	244	322	377	405	224	295	188	348	294	234	216	231	367	21	3,999	0.59%
Harischandra Wijayatunga	SMBP	109	170	142	164	178	152	167	158	177	145	114	165	118	157	95	2,211	0.32%
Nihal Galappaththi	SLPF	105	112	171	176	148	101	104	91	135	164	109	96	102	166	62	1,842	0.27%
A.J. Ranashinge	Ind 1	103	151	100	130	121	114	146	151	124	117	103	108	87	118	41	1,714	0.25%
Valid Votes		47,842	51,806	35,350	52,891	49,891	53,214	53,349	42,278	45,476	49,067	39,200	41,062	41,012	57,283	20,623	680,344	100.00%
Rejected Votes		467	738	699	858	919	651	773	682	831	834	515	647	610	962	325	10,511	
Total Polled		48,309	52,544	36,049	53,749	50,810	53,865	54,122	42,960	46,307	49,901	39,715	41,709	41,622	58,245	20,948	690,855	
Registered Electors		61,107	69,064	49,109	69,872	67,182	68,616	69,233	59,146	60,627	64,434	52,667	55,872	53,579	76,083		876,591	
Turnout		79.06%	76.08%	73.41%	76.92%	75.63%	78.50%	78.17%	72.63%	76.38%	77.45%	75.41%	74.65%	77.68%	76.55%		78.81%	

== 1999 Provincial Council Election ==
Results of the 3rd North Western provincial council election held on 25 January 1999 for the district:

Party	Votes	%	Seats
People's Alliance (SLFP, SLMC et al.)	405,431	56.16%	20
United National Party	273,892	37.94%	13
Janatha Vimukthi Peramuna	31,221	4.32%	2
New Left Front (NSSP et al.)	9,456	1.31%	0
Muslim United Liberation Front	971	0.13%	0
Liberal Party	676	0.09%	0
Independent	309	0.04%	0
Valid Votes	721,956	100.00%	35
Rejected Votes			
Total Polled			
Registered Electors	960,241		
Turnout			

== 1999 Presidential Election ==
Results of the 4th presidential election held on 21 December 1999 for the district:

Candidate	Party	Votes per Polling Division														Postal Votes	Total Votes	%
Candidate	Party	Bingi -riya	Damba- deniya	Dodan -gas- landa	Galga -muwa	Hiri- yala	Katu- gampola	Kuliya- pitiya	Kurune -gala	Mawath -agama	Nikawe -ratiya	Pandu -was- nuwara	Polgaha -wela	Wariya -pola	Yapa -huwa	Postal Votes	Total Votes	%
Chandrika Kumaratunga	PA	27,022	30,403	19,594	31,610	24,366	31,996	28,350	23,715	23,463	26,123	22,991	22,890	24,187	31,252	9,521	377,483	50.77%
Ranil Wickremasinghe	UNP	23,876	24,457	17,011	23,395	24,589	23,680	27,228	22,450	21,972	23,694	18,484	20,537	18,163	28,525	8,266	326,327	43.89%
Nandana Gunathilake	JVP	1,143	2,158	2,283	2,645	2,101	1,824	1,662	1,700	1,838	1,789	1,197	1,353	1,847	2,714	1,100	27,354	3.68%
Harischandra Wijayatunga	SMBP	129	214	137	111	240	184	180	355	217	135	103	230	133	151	185	2,704	0.36%
W.V.M. Ranjith	Ind 2	112	128	140	186	156	124	136	100	158	125	101	114	103	206	0	1,889	0.25%
T. Edirisuriya	Ind 1	96	110	154	166	136	116	106	113	115	125	74	98	106	149	7	1,671	0.22%
Rajiva Wijesinha	Liberal	85	111	147	176	165	93	113	106	106	124	99	84	80	166	5	1,660	0.22%
Abdul Rasool	SLMP	64	72	102	75	104	77	120	147	250	75	58	84	55	65	7	1,355	0.18%
Vasudeva Nanayakkara	LDA	55	58	95	55	70	48	60	112	71	53	32	58	78	70	96	1,011	0.14%
Kamal Karunadasa	PLSF	53	66	74	85	70	57	50	50	54	62	53	50	47	95	6	872	0.12%
Hudson Samarasinghe	Ind 3	35	45	44	43	60	37	44	27	51	35	34	37	25	58	3	578	0.08%
A. Dissanayaka	DUNF	13	19	24	6	44	21	23	17	35	24	15	17	21	24	11	314	0.04%
A.W. Premawardhana	PFF	18	26	16	17	28	18	28	22	23	19	11	27	24	24	0	301	0.04%
Valid Votes		52,701	57,867	39,821	58,570	52,129	58,275	58,100	48,914	48,353	52,383	43,252	45,579	44,869	63,499	19,207	743,519	100.00%
Rejected Votes		789	1,082	1,147	1,068	1,535	718	977	1,101	995	1,191	835	908	965	1,269	692	15,272	
Total Polled		53,490	58,949	40,968	59,638	53,664	58,993	59,077	50,015	49,348	53,574	44,087	46,487	45,834	64,768	19,899	758,791	
Registered Electors		68,736	75,865	55,412	79,147	74,632	75,795	77,629	66,346	67,307	72,758	58,677	61,882	59,601	86,938		980,725	
Turnout		77.82%	77.70%	73.93%	75.35%	71.90%	77.83%	76.10%	75.39%	73.32%	73.63%	75.14%	75.12%	76.90%	74.50%		77.37%	

== 2000 Parliamentary General Election ==
Results of the 11th parliamentary election held on 10 October 2000 for the district:

Party	Votes per Polling Division														Postal Votes	Total Votes	%	Seats
Party	Bingi -riya	Damba- deniya	Dodan -gas- landa	Galga -muwa	Hiri- yala	Katu- gampola	Kuliya- pitiya	Kurune -gala	Mawath -agama	Nikawe -ratiya	Pandu -was- nuwara	Polgaha -wela	Wariya -pola	Yapa -huwa	Postal Votes	Total Votes	%	Seats
People's Alliance (SLFP et al.)	25,696	28,865	18,208	31,133	23,423	30,492	25,374	20,826	21,075	25,831	20,849	21,421	21,184	30,832	13,585	358,794	47.17%	8
United National Party	23,852	25,527	16,951	24,541	25,875	23,173	26,570	23,046	22,502	22,752	19,348	20,788	18,932	28,227	10,539	332,623	43.73%	6
Janatha Vimukthi Peramuna	1,807	3,418	3,155	2,663	2,807	2,877	2,916	3,054	2,760	2,607	1,830	2,374	2,709	3,824	1,979	40,780	5.36%	1
National Unity Alliance (SLMC)	860	451	1,177	495	840	633	1,834	821	1,574	827	1,302	769	112	169	63	11,927	1.57%	0
Sinhala Heritage	328	477	201	72	447	571	830	1,144	427	174	316	516	664	135	39	6,691	0.88%	0
New Left Front (NSSP et al.)	244	231	325	398	286	236	273	155	298	243	189	213	213	366	22	3,692	0.49%	0
Citizen's Front	80	76	51	155	58	36	123	47	62	754	38	76	37	140	84	1,817	0.24%	0
United Lalith Front	66	60	57	69	92	68	73	51	65	54	62	46	55	67	6	891	0.12%	0
Independent 2	36	32	35	39	42	27	48	25	34	94	30	36	36	64	0	578	0.08%	0
Liberal Party	30	34	24	45	31	11	36	94	28	75	43	19	53	7	0	530	0.07%	0
Sinhalaye Mahasammatha Bhoomiputra Pakshaya	31	51	26	17	31	48	30	80	48	28	16	44	52	5	3	510	0.07%	0
Muslim United Liberation Front	28	50	28	34	35	36	55	24	39	39	28	30	26	5	5	462	0.06%	0
Democratic United National Front	24	28	38	37	15	28	30	30	27	34	25	12	24	26	8	386	0.05%	0
United Sinhala Great Council	19	17	24	17	33	19	24	13	17	17	16	12	19	17	3	267	0.04%	0
Independent 1	20	11	14	17	21	15	18	13	12	16	15	9	12	5	1	199	0.03%	0
Sri Lanka Muslim Party	21	7	7	7	6	12	6	8	12	8	10	13	10	20	389	186	0.02%	0
Sri Lanka Progressive Front	11	7	10	7	9	12	11	7	23	9	9	9	6	15	1	146	0.02%	0
National Development Front	7	5	8	8	10	5	5	8	8	6	6	8	3	8	2	97	0.01%	0
Peoples Freedom Front	1	8	3	5	19	7	8	2	3	3	10	9	7	7	1	93	0.01%	0
Valid Votes	53,161	59,355	40,342	59,759	54,080	58,306	58,264	49,448	49,034*	53,571	44,142	46,404	44,154	64,003*	26,735*	760,757*	100.00%	15
Rejected Votes	1,676	2,273	2,476	2,796	3,276	2,300	2,680	2,231	2,498	3,050	2,029	2,037	2,233	3,451	615	35,621		
Total Polled	54,837	61,628	42,818	62,555	57,356	60,606	60,944	51,679	51,532	56,621	46,171	48,441	46,387	67,454	27,350	796,378		
Registered Electors	70,198	78,230	56,942	81,446	76,763	77,549	79,777	68,296	69,153	74,822	60,131	63,613	61,292	89,198		1,007,410		
Turnout	78.12%	78.78%	75.20%	76.81%	74.72%	78.15%	76.39%	75.67%	74.52%	75.67%	76.78%	76.15%	75.68%	75.62%		79.05%		

The following candidates were elected: Gamini Jayawickrama Perera (UNP), 123,847 preference votes (pv); Johnston Fernando (UNP), 94,385 pv; S.B. Nawinne (PA), 81,259 pv; Jayarathna Herath (PA), 61,853 pv; Anura Priyadharshana Yapa (PA), 60,479 pv; Piyasoma Upali (UNP), 54,756 pv; Salinda Dissanayake (PA), 52,727 pv; Rohitha Bogollagama (UNP), 52,095 pv; Sarath Munasinghe (PA), 51,530 pv; Amara Piyaseeli Ratnayake (UNP), 51,498 pv; Rathnayake Mudiyanselage Rathna Nimal Bandara (UNP), 49,962 pv; Somakumari Tennakoon (PA), 49,476 pv; Ranjith Navaratne (PA), 49,174 pv; Munidasa Premachandra (PA), 48,905 pv; and Nimal Herath (JVP), 3,407 pv.

== 2001 Parliamentary General Election ==
Results of the 12th parliamentary election held on 5 December 2001 for the district:

Party	Votes per Polling Division														Postal Votes	Total Votes	%	Seats
Party	Bingi -riya	Damba- deniya	Dodan -gas- landa	Galga -muwa	Hiri- yala	Katu- gampola	Kuliya- pitiya	Kurune -gala	Mawath -agama	Nikawe -ratiya	Pandu -was- nuwara	Polgaha -wela	Wariya -pola	Yapa -huwa	Postal Votes	Total Votes	%	Seats
United National Front (UNP, SLMC, CWC, WPF)	28,297	29,321	18,703	28,330	26,882	26,711	30,901	26,830	26,507	27,615	23,125	24,494	20,525	32,601		382,768	48.59%	8
People's Alliance (SLFP et al.)	23,510	26,714	17,938	27,465	20,884	27,964	25,266	19,359	20,365	23,120	20,093	20,487	20,099	27,843		332,775	42.24%	6
Janatha Vimukthi Peramuna	2,769	5,349	4,147	5,167	4,292	5,140	4,162	4,656	4,134	4,204	2,875	3,223	3,960	6,417		63,652	8.08%	1
New Left Front (NSSP et al.)	183	211	203	342	265	189	230	171	250	208	227	174	89	329		3,194	0.41%	0
Sinhala Heritage	156	207	102	46	262	229	191	520	279	73	105	340	100	92		2,842	0.36%	0
United Lalith Front	45	65	58	55	57	42	62	52	67	42	28	55	51	60		746	0.09%	0
Democratic United National Front	37	30	27	48	28	32	22	16	27	28	25	29	28	31		412	0.05%	0
Independent 7	16	23	15	19	11	14	21	11	20	25	14	15	21	24		249	0.03%	0
Liberal Party	8	10	16	26	12	13	13	23	23	16	9	4	8	18		200	0.03%	0
United Sinhala Great Council	6	11	15	7	17	10	16	9	9	10	7	9	11	8		148	0.02%	0
National Development Front	5	13	12	10	9	10	8	9	5	9	8	7	10	16		134	0.02%	0
Independent 2	9	10	6	11	6	6	7	7	6	12	9	9	5	9		112	0.01%	0
Sri Lanka Muslim Party	4	10	5	9	6	6	5	6	8	3	5	10	5	6		89	0.01%	0
Independent 3	6	4	6	11	9	7	5	6	7	4	0	4	7	4		80	0.01%	0
Independent 1	4	3	4	1	4	5	7	1	6	9	2	3	2	8		60	0.01%	0
Independent 6	2	2	4	3	7	4	4	5	3	3	3	3	5	5		53	0.01%	0
Independent 4	10	1	3	4	3	1	4	2	3	2	4	1	5	5		48	0.01%	0
Ruhuna People\'s Party	5	4	0	4	2	7	2	3	2	2	4	1	3	5		44	0.01%	0
Sri Lanka National Front	7	5	1	3	5	3	3	1	4	2	2	2	2	2		42	0.01%	0
Sri Lanka Progressive Front	2	1	1	4	5	4	5	2	1	6	3	2	0	5		41	0.01%	0
Independent 5	7	2	5	4	0	0	3	4	4	4	1	2	2	1		39	0.00%	0
Valid Votes	55,088	61,996	41,271	61,569	52,766	60,397	60,937	51,693	51,730	55,397	46,549	48,874	44,938	67,489		787,728	100.00%	15
Rejected Votes	2,690	2,386	2,720	2,855	3,191	2,709	3,482	2,170	2,467	3,326	2,056	2,224	2,720	2,971		38,401		
Total Polled	57,778	64,382	43,991	64,424	55,957	63,106	64,419	53,863	54,197	58,723	48,605	51,098	47,658	70,460		826,129		
Registered Electors	72,990	80,821	58,998	84,253	80,000	80,221	82,926	71,111	72,027	77,522	62,636	66,099	63,298	92,750		1,045,652		
Turnout	79.16%	79.66%	74.56%	76.46%	69.95%	78.67%	77.68%	75.74%	75.25%	75.75%	77.60%	77.31%	75.29%	75.97%		79.01%		

The following candidates were elected: Gamini Jayawickrama Perera (UNF), 141,702 preference votes (pv); Johnston Fernando (UNF), 114,845 pv; S.B. Nawinne (PA), 78,718 pv; Salinda Dissanayake (PA), 69,963 pv; Indika Bandaranayake (UNF), 69,513 pv; Anura Priyadharshana Yapa (PA), 67,717 pv; Rohitha Bogollagama (UNF), 65,576 pv; D.M. Bandaranayake (UNF), 52,808 pv; Piyasoma Upali (UNF), 50,963 pv; Amara Piyaseeli Ratnayake (UNF), 50,963 pv; Anura Gopallawa (UNF), 48,672 pv; Jayarathna Herath (PA), 47,471 pv; T. B. Ekanayake (PA), 43,994 pv; Somakumari Tennakoon (PA), 42,918 pv; and Bimal Rathnayaka (JVP), 4,240 pv.

== 2004 Parliamentary General Election ==
Results of the 13th parliamentary election held on 2 April 2004 for the district:

Party	Votes per Polling Division														Postal Votes	Total Votes	%	Seats
Party	Bingi -riya	Damba- deniya	Dodan -gas- landa	Galga -muwa	Hiri- yala	Katu- gampola	Kuliya- pitiya	Kurune -gala	Mawath -agama	Nikawe -ratiya	Pandu -was- nuwara	Polgaha -wela	Wariya -pola	Yapa -huwa	Postal Votes	Total Votes	%	Seats
United People's Freedom Alliance (SLFP, JVP et al.)	27,815	31,740	22,426	36,037	26,607	31,388	29,878	23,472	24,974	29,545	22,103	24,473	24,886	37,155	19,658	412,157	51.93%	9
United National Front (UNP, SLMC, CWC, WPF)	24,120	24,528	18,073	25,377	25,167	24,936	27,127	23,242	23,158	22,885	21,297	20,435	19,554	28,281	12,588	340,768	42.94%	7
Jathika Hela Urumaya	2,504	3,422	1,138	795	2,740	3,212	3,413	5,347	3,391	1,427	1,803	3,237	1,569	1,387	2,074	37,459	4.72%	0
National Development Front	130	80	47	31	63	80	109	92	109	88	39	86	41		15	1,058	0.13%	0
United Muslim People's Party	37	25	46	41	56	31	39	37	65	34	26	30	27		8	550	0.07%	0
New Left Front (NSSP et al.)	35	13	21	11	34	18	18	45	42	11	16	27	18		18	349	0.04%	0
Independent 10	29	12	18	26	19	21	35	16	18	33	14	14	10		3	286	0.04%	0
United Socialist Party	22	19	19	16	25	17	23	9	25	25	12	16	12		2	265	0.03%	0
United Lalith Front	19	26	10	9	10	17	19	16	15	13	11	8	7		1	191	0.02%	0
Independent 9	10	4	7	8	5	4	2	5	7	4	1	5	1		0	70	0.01%	0
Sinhalaye Mahasammatha Bhoomiputra Pakshaya	1	7	2	4	4	4	10	5	10	4	2	3	2		4	64	0.01%	0
Liberal Party	3	1	3	1	2	2	3	10	11	1	0	5	8		0	54	0.01%	0
Independent 5	5	1	1	2	4	6	0	0	13	2	2	7	6		0	53	0.01%	0
Sri Lanka National Front	3	5	0	3	2	3	4	1	5	3	2	3	5		5	48	0.01%	0
Sri Lanka Muslim Party	6	3	2	2	1	3	5	7	1	3	1	2	1		2	39	0.00%	0
Independent 3	3	3	1	1	5	3	5	2	2	2	0	1	1		3	36	0.00%	0
Independent 8	2	2	2	7	4	3	2	0	3	2	1	2	1		2	34	0.00%	0
Sri Lanka Progressive Front	3	5	0	3	0	3	0	1	4	3	1	1	2		0	28	0.00%	0
Swarajya	0	1	0	2	1	6	0	3	1	1	3	3	0		1	25	0.00%	0
Independent 1	3	1	0	1	0	1	4	2	2	1	2	2	0		4	25	0.00%	0
Independent 4	2	3	0	0	2	1	0	3	4	1	1	1	1		2	23	0.00%	0
Independent 7	1	0	0	4	2	3	0	4	0	2	0	1	1		1	20	0.00%	0
Independent 2	3	1	0	0	1	3	3	2	0	1	0	1	1		0	17	0.00%	0
Ruhuna People's Party	0	0	1	0	2	2	2	3	1	4	0	0	0		2	17	0.00%	0
Independent 6	0	0	1	0	0	0	1	1	0	4	2	0	1		1	11	0.00%	0
Valid Votes	54,756	59,902	41,818	62,381	54,756	59,767	60,702	52,325	51,861	54,099	45,339	48,363	46,155	67,029*	34,394	793,647	100.00%	16
Rejected Votes	2,190	2,641	2,739	3,061	3,326	3,021	3,455	2,089	2,753	4,086	2,454	2,090	2,617	3,217*	603	40,396		
Total Polled	56,946	62,543	44,557	65,442	58,082	62,788	64,157	54,414	54,614	58,185	47,793	50,453	48,772	70,246*	34,997	834,043		
Registered Electors	75,985	83,250	61,727	88,822	83,535	83,645	86,416	74,368	75,264	80,736	64,979	68,091	65,847	96,817*		1,089,482		
Turnout	74.94%	75.13%	72.18%	73.68%	69.53%	75.06%	74.24%	73.17%	72.56%	72.07%	73.55%	74.10%	74.07%	72.56%*		76.55%		

The following candidates were elected: Anura Kumara Dissanayake (UPFA-JVP), 153,868 preference votes (pv); Gamini Jayawickrama Perera (UNF-UNP), 119,176 pv; Bimal Rathnayaka (UPFA-JVP), 116,736 pv; M. D. Namal Karunaratne (UPFA-JVP), 114,516 pv; Johnston Fernando (UNF-UNP), 112,601 pv; Akila Viraj Kariyawasam (UNF-UNP), 83,114 pv; Anura Priyadharshana Yapa (UPFA-SLFP), 65,724 pv; Indika Bandaranayake (UNF-UNP), 65,275 pv; T. B. Ekanayake (UPFA-SLFP), 57,079 pv; S.B. Nawinne (UPFA-SLFP), 53,876 pv; Jayarathna Herath (UPFA-SLFP), 53,236 pv; Dayasiri Jayasekara (UNF-UNP), 52,576 pv; Salinda Dissanayake (UPFA-SLFP), 52,520 pv; Bandula Basnayake (UPFA-SLFP), 52,099 pv; Amara Piyaseeli Ratnayake (UNF-UNP), 46,725 pv; and Rohitha Bogollagama (UNF-UNP), 44,206 pv.

== 2004 Provincial Council Election ==
Results of the 4th North Western provincial council election held on 24 April 2004 for the district:

Party	Votes per Polling Division														Postal Votes	Total Votes	%	Seats
Party	Bingi -riya	Damba- deniya	Dodan -gas- landa	Galga -muwa	Hiri- yala	Katu- gampola	Kuliya- pitiya	Kurune -gala	Mawath -agama	Nikawe -ratiya	Pandu -was- nuwara	Polgaha -wela	Wariya -pola	Yapa -huwa	Postal Votes	Total Votes	%	Seats
United People's Freedom Alliance (SLFP, JVP et al.)	24,488	27,472	20,258	33,579	21,759	27,398	27,985	19,868	22,168	27,290	20,244	21,164	22,884	31,582	13,945	362,084	59.85%	20
United National Party	15,661	16,386	11,555	13,849	14,030	16,842	17,366	14,895	15,109	15,085	13,093	12,310	13,585	19,177	6,962	215,905	35.69%	12
Sri Lanka Muslim Congress	1,515	750	2,737	1,557	1,647	478	3,931	1,886	2,468	2,094	2,329	1,416	469	759	137	24,173	4.00%	2
United Lalith Front	67	60	72	55	67	81	43	54	73	53	47	41	82	80	8	883	0.15%	0
National Development Front	56	45	36	51	43	35	37	57	77	46	20	43	33	28	16	623	0.10%	0
New Left Front (NSSP et al.)	6	22	11	3	249	10	9	38	17	15	6	32	26	11	21	476	0.08%	0
Sinhalaye Mahasammatha Bhoomiputra Pakshaya	12	13	12	8	44	16	12	62	19	17	8	32	9	9	22	295	0.05%	0
Independent	20	12	24	10	18	8	15	12	18	9	3	8	6	6	9	178	0.03%	0
Sri Lanka Progressive Front	8	6	16	11	12	5	34	8	11	3	12	8	5	3	3	145	0.02%	0
United Sinhala Great Council	10	7	4	5	6	6	3	9	4	6	5	3	6	6	11	91	0.02%	0
Sri Lanka Muslim Party	3	5	8	8	6	4	6	15	9	2	10	3	0	3	1	83	0.01%	0
Sri Lanka National Front	5	0	1	3	7	3	5	3	5	4	0	2	0	2	3	43	0.01%	0
Valid Votes	41,851	44,778	34,734	49,139	37,888	44,886	49,446	36,907	39,978	44,624	35,777	35,062	37,105	51,666	21,138	604,979	100.00%	34
Rejected Votes	1,560	2,082	1,853	2,925	1,937	1,905	2,041	1,518	1,798	2,247	1,483	1,491	1,761	3,012	406	28,019		
Total Polled	43,411	46,860	36,587	52,064	39,825	46,791	51,487	38,425	41,776	46,871	37,260	36,553	38,866	54,678	21,544	632,998		
Registered Electors	75,985	83,250	61,727	88,822	83,535	83,645	86,416	74,368	75,264	80,736	64,979	68,091	65,847	96,817		1,089,482		
Turnout	57.13%	56.29%	59.27%	58.62%	47.67%	55.94%	59.58%	51.67%	55.51%	58.05%	57.34%	53.68%	59.02%	56.48%		58.10%		

The following candidates were elected: Athula Wijesinghe (UPFA), 71,298 preference votes (pv); S. A. Ranasinghe (UPFA), 50,949 pv; A. D. Sumanadasa (UPFA), 45,310 pv; K. M. Nimal Herath (UPFA), 44,141 pv; H. M. K. Manik Gunasekara (UPFA), 43,829 pv; S. N. Wickramasinghe (UPFA), 40,647 pv; Neil Priyantha Liyanage (UPFA), 38,344 pv; K. A. Gunadasa Khannangara (UPFA), 37,482 pv; R. D. Wimaladasa (UPFA), 36,660 pv; Adikari Mudiyanselage Tikiribandara Adikari (UPFA), 33,973 pv; R. B. S. W. M. Manjula C. R. Bandara (UNP), 30,757 pv; R. M. Nilantha Supun Rajapaksha (UPFA), 30,720 pv; Kumara Keerthi Chandrasiri (UPFA), 29,618 pv; Ajith Rohana Devatha Pejjalage (UNP), 29,604 pv; R. P. D. Gunadasa (UPFA), 28,420 pv; Alawathuwala Jayadeva Chandrawansha (UNP), 28,134 pv; Upulangani Malagamuwa (UPFA), 26,801 pv; Dharmasiri Dasanayaka (UPFA), 25,839 pv; Abayarathna Herath Banda (UNP), 25,838 pv; Kuda Widanalage Shantha Bandara (UPFA), 25,334 pv; Ananda Chandralal (UPFA), 21,774 pv; A. A. Somasiri Gunathilaka (UPFA), 21,620 pv; Luxman Wendaruwa (UPFA), 21,595 pv; Alankarage Ruban Silva (UNP), 20,867 pv; Bandara Rajapaksha (UPFA), 20,530 pv; Prasanna Shamal Senarath (UNP), 20,345 pv; Dissanayaka Mudiyanselage Gamini Dissanayaka (UNP), 19,616 pv; R.M.Gunasinghe Banda (UNP), 19,537; Alavi Ahamad Hasan Mohomad (UNP), 18,821 pv; Ekanayaka Mudiyanselage Gamini Somasiri Ekanayaka (UNP), 16,404 pv; Ananda Punya Kumara (UNP), 16,018 pv; Ekanayaka Mudiyanselage Nanda Shanthi Kumari Ekanayaka (UNP), 15,383 pv; Mohmood Mohamed Thasleem (SLMC), 8,742 pv; and Aga Jawarsha M. Rizvi (SLMC), 6,017 pv.

== 2005 Presidential Election ==
Results of the 5th presidential election held on 17 November 2005 for the district:

Candidate	Party	Votes per Polling Division														Postal Votes	Total Votes	%
Candidate	Party	Bingi -riya	Damba- deniya	Dodan -gas- landa	Galga -muwa	Hiri- yala	Katu- gampola	Kuliya- pitiya	Kurune -gala	Mawath -agama	Nikawe -ratiya	Pandu -was- nuwara	Polgaha -wela	Wariya -pola	Yapa -huwa	Postal Votes	Total Votes	%
Mahinda Rajapaksa	UPFA	30,624	37,231	24,658	37,876	30,785	35,311	34,357	28,791	29,513	32,978	26,365	27,581	29,155	40,136	23,146	468,507	52.26%
Ranil Wickremasinghe	UNP	29,941	29,818	21,100	30,720	31,412	31,580	33,874	29,564	28,658	29,691	25,456	25,317	22,919	34,469	14,290	418,809	46.72%
A.A. Suraweera	NDF	172	190	166	219	185	159	145	147	201	195	115	155	137	165	18	2,369	0.26%
Siritunga Jayasuriya	USP	168	175	181	163	171	183	206	136	172	159	156	138	125	214	10	2,357	0.26%
Victor Hettigoda	ULPP	77	104	42	64	80	109	89	90	83	56	57	72	85	51	83	1,142	0.13%
Chamil Jayaneththi	NLF	44	40	51	66	59	51	39	24	48	50	63	32	47	64	17	695	0.08%
Aruna de Soyza	RPP	43	41	48	67	41	38	33	40	43	43	29	39	31	67	10	613	0.07%
Wimal Geeganage	SLNF	33	41	40	43	50	46	37	22	38	49	36	39	30	52	10	566	0.06%
Anura De Silva	ULF	26	51	29	33	44	37	45	37	38	54	25	30	29	41	5	524	0.06%
A.K.J. Arachchige	DUA	28	19	28	38	35	29	26	12	30	31	15	24	28	14	6	363	0.04%
Wije Dias	SEP	21	10	21	21	22	19	23	18	19	9	11	18	19	18	6	255	0.03%
P. Nelson Perera	SLPF	13	14	20	17	11	8	8	14	13	10	16	11	8	18	6	187	0.02%
H.S. Dharmadwaja	UNAF	5	7	7	8	5	12	10	1	11	7	6	11	5	13	2	110	0.01%
Valid Votes		61,195	67,741	46,391	69,335	62,900	67,582	68,892	58,896	58,867	63,332	52,350	53,467	52,618	75,322	37,609	896,497	100.00%
Rejected Votes		394	599	607	610	793	522	658	625	607	532	392	437	540	728	414	8,458	
Total Polled		61,589	68,340	46,998	69,945	63,693	68,104	69,550	59,521	59,474	63,864	52,742	53,904	53,158	76,050	38,023	904,955	
Registered Electors		78,140	85,455	63,143	91,698	86,112	85,753	89,722	77,003	77,819	83,696	67,023	69,821	68,194	100,497		1,124,076	
Turnout		78.82%	79.97%	74.43%	76.28%	73.97%	79.42%	77.52%	77.30%	76.43%	76.30%	78.69%	77.20%	77.95%	75.67%		80.51%	

== 2009 Provincial Council Election ==
Results of the 5th North Western provincial council election held on 14 February 2009 for the district:

Party	Votes per Polling Division														Postal Votes	Total Votes	%	Seats
Party	Bingi -riya	Damba- deniya	Dodan -gas- landa	Galga -muwa	Hiri- yala	Katu- gampola	Kuliya- pitiya	Kurune -gala	Mawath -agama	Nikawe -ratiya	Pandu -was- nuwara	Polgaha -wela	Wariya -pola	Yapa -huwa	Postal Votes	Total Votes	%	Seats
United People's Freedom Alliance (SLFP et al.)	31,695	39,844	23,608	40,531	36,154	36,064	38,751	29,974	31,950	35,663	28,235	29,710	31,462	41,915	21,810	497,366	70.13%	24
United National Party	13,910	15,195	13,340	11,431	11,806	16,290	18,459	15,058	16,061	12,309	12,408	11,429	8,481	12,623	4,748	193,548	27.29%	9
Janatha Vimukthi Peramuna	569	1,179	1,133	1,417	808	1,146	865	1,317	950	1,232	652	1,372	856	1,954	634	16,084	2.27%	1
United National Alliance	71	91	71	54	79	83	94	77	96	83	51	60	46	92	29	1,077	0.15%	0
Independent 4	4	6	7	6	4	24	6	19	23	6	2	214	4	19	6	350	0.05%	0
Independent 1	7	6	24	7	19	22	6	6	42	10	36	5	9	14	5	218	0.03%	0
Sinhalaye Mahasammatha Bhoomiputra Pakshaya	6	2	5	5	2	8	6	11	5	4	5	27	5	5	18	114	0.02%	0
Independent 5	8	3	4	13	7	5	10	12	9	5	6	6	5	8	4	105	0.01%	0
United Lanka Great Council	9	9	4	10	2	6	2	6	6	3	2	9	1	14	3	86	0.01%	0
Patriotic National Front	6	4	4	10	4	5	4	7	5	5	1	5	2	6	5	73	0.01%	0
Independent 3	4	2	1	2	1	5	10	1	4	7	2	6	2	15	2	64	0.01%	0
Independent 2	6	3	4	1	4	2	6	6	3	4	2	4	3	4	6	58	0.01%	0
Sri Lanka Progressive Front	2	4	1	3	2	2	2	7	4	2	1	3	3	4	3	43	0.01%	0
Valid Votes	46,297	56,348	38,206	53,490	48,892	53,662	58,221	46,501	49,158	49,333	41,403	42,850	40,879	56,673	27,273	709,186	100.00%	34
Rejected Votes	1,619	1,877	1,890	2,249	2,145	1,721	1,972	1,619	1,967	2,115	1,313	1,541	1,546	2,514	572	26,660		
Total Polled	47,916	58,225	40,096	55,739	51,037	55,383	60,193	48,120	51,125	51,448	42,716	44,391	42,425	59,187	27,845	735,846		
Registered Electors	81,412	88,927	65,459	95,491	90,963	88,834	93,845	80,308	81,646	87,102	69,672	72,413	71,255	104,554		1,171,881		
Turnout	58.86%	65.48%	61.25%	58.37%	56.11%	62.34%	64.14%	59.92%	62.62%	59.07%	61.31%	61.30%	59.54%	56.61%		62.79%		

The following candidates were elected: Athula Wijesinghe (UPFA), 90,295 preference votes (pv); R. M. S. Somakumari Thennakoon (UPFA), 67,998 pv; K. W. Shantha Bandara (UPFA), 61,865 pv; Chandana Prasad Yapa (UPFA), 59,500 pv; Neranjan Wickramasinghe (UPFA), 56,768 pv; R. D. Wimaladasa (UPFA), 54,380 pv; Piyumal Herath (UPFA), 49,848 pv; Manjula Dissanayake (UPFA), 47,543 pv; D. B. Herath (UPFA), 43,896 pv; R. P. D. Gunadasa Dehigama (UPFA), 41,171 pv; Prasanna Shamal Senarath (UNP), 40,429 pv; H. M. D. B. Herath (UPFA), 38,371 pv; A. Don Kamal Indika (UPFA), 37,515 pv; A. A. Somasiri Gunathilaka (UPFA), 32,952 pv; Kumara Keerthi Chandrasiri (UPFA), 32,508 pv; R. M. Bandara Rajapaksha (UPFA), 32,252 pv; R. M. Nilantha Supun Rajapaksha (UPFA), 31,223 pv; Asanka Nawaratne (UPFA), 30,758 pv; Wendaruwa Lakshman (UPFA), 28,476 pv; Dharmasiri Dasanayaka (UPFA), 28,057 pv; Chandra Kamalasiri (UPFA), 28,033 pv; Adikari Mudiyanselage Tikiribandara Adikari (UPFA), 27,125 pv; Shelton Nimal Pieris (UPFA), 23,841 pv; Aga Jawarsha M. Rizvi (UNP), 22,663 pv; R. M. S. K. Rajapaksha (UPFA), 22,020 pv; Asuramana Pejjalage Keerthirathne (UPFA), 21,338 pv; Amarasena Girana Pathirannahalage Thushara Indunil (UNP), 20,581 pv; Alawathuwala J. C. (UNP), 19,131 pv; M. A. Nimal Senarath Wijesinghe (UNP), 17,400 pv; Alavi Ahamad Hasan Mohomad (UNP), 17,029 pv; Asanalebbege Mohommadu Nazeer Nazeer (UNP), 16,253 pv; Mohmood Mohamed Thasleem (UNP), 15,706 pv; Ajith Rohana Devatha Pejjalage (UNP), 15,468 pv; and K. M. Nimal Herath (JVP), 2,190 pv.

== 2010 Presidential Election ==
Results of the 6th presidential election held on 26 January 2010 for the district:

Candidate	Party	Votes per Polling Division														Postal Votes	Total Votes	%
Candidate	Party	Bingi -riya	Damba- deniya	Dodan -gas- landa	Galga -muwa	Hiri- yala	Katu- gampola	Kuliya- pitiya	Kurune -gala	Mawath -agama	Nikawe -ratiya	Pandu -was- nuwara	Polgaha -wela	Wariya -pola	Yapa -huwa	Postal Votes	Total Votes	%
Mahinda Rajapaksa	UPFA	38,036	44,172	28,907	46,752	42,240	43,052	41,881	34,912	36,237	41,510	32,854	34,501	36,497	49,854	31,379	582,784	63.08%
Sarath Fonseka	NDF	23,273	23,056	17,596	21,666	22,538	25,547	27,813	25,113	23,999	21,830	19,681	19,328	16,282	25,199	14,673	327,594	35.46%
M.C.M. Ismail	DUNF	169	161	198	307	269	127	200	277	208	278	182	146	185	365	40	3,112	0.34%
A.A. Suraweera	NDF	124	109	169	192	140	97	130	112	163	156	107	120	128	179	17	1,943	0.21%
W.V. Mahiman Ranjith	Ind 1	108	100	117	189	115	119	104	78	96	138	98	88	89	210	20	1,669	0.18%
A.S.P Liyanage	SLLP	56	64	71	98	83	64	57	65	69	45	41	59	62	83	5	922	0.10%
C.J. Sugathsiri Gamage	UDF	54	65	69	77	80	67	70	51	95	56	54	48	57	58	11	912	0.10%
Ukkubanda Wijekoon	Ind 3	48	87	48	42	72	40	70	51	84	60	37	47	48	70	9	813	0.09%
Sarath Manamendra	NSH	33	29	41	54	56	34	60	47	43	44	28	29	37	65	4	604	0.07%
Lal Perera	ONF	36	31	46	47	47	43	45	36	29	37	37	30	29	54	6	553	0.06%
Siritunga Jayasuriya	USP	40	24	45	31	41	30	33	29	46	32	31	29	35	40	6	492	0.05%
Aithurus M. Illias	Ind 2	36	25	28	40	32	22	42	27	52	36	31	32	27	38	7	475	0.05%
Vikramabahu Karunaratne	LF	37	29	24	26	36	25	30	29	27	21	24	17	31	33	10	399	0.04%
M. K. Shivajilingam	Ind 5	15	21	21	27	18	22	22	17	37	21	16	14	16	34	1	302	0.03%
Wije Dias	SEP	13	14	12	23	17	16	13	18	14	11	11	11	21	25	1	220	0.02%
Sanath Pinnaduwa	NA	17	21	18	10	12	13	18	16	18	14	12	6	9	19	0	203	0.02%
M. Mohamed Musthaffa	Ind 4	17	10	13	20	9	11	16	7	14	14	11	11	9	21	2	185	0.02%
Senaratna de Silva	PNF	15	7	12	13	11	12	12	10	10	21	10	10	7	24	3	177	0.02%
Battaramulla Seelarathana	JP	13	5	16	13	15	11	12	5	14	13	7	10	11	17	9	171	0.02%
Aruna de Soyza	RPP	13	5	8	9	7	10	19	9	15	11	8	8	9	14	1	146	0.02%
M.B. Thaminimulla	ACAKO	8	9	9	11	9	9	15	4	8	14	3	6	5	8	0	118	0.01%
Sarath Kongahage	UNAF	13	3	3	14	6	9	6	9	8	7	2	5	4	8	2	99	0.01%
Valid Votes		62,174	68,047	47,471	69,661	65,853	69,380	70,668	60,922	61,286	64,369	53,285	54,555	53,598	76,418	46,206	923,893	100.00%
Rejected Votes		360	436	308	334	548	390	349	492	458	432	270	311	343	502	1,111	6,644	
Total Polled		62,534	68,483	47,779	69,995	66,401	69,770	71,017	61,414	61,744	64,801	53,555	54,866	53,941	76,920	47,317	930,537	
Registered Electors		82,441	89,631	65,846	96,354	92,150	89,310	94,743	81,523	82,656	87,897	70,131	73,283	71,905	105,779		1,183,649	
Turnout		75.85%	76.41%	72.56%	72.64%	72.06%	78.12%	74.96%	75.33%	74.70%	73.72%	76.36%	74.87%	75.02%	72.72%		78.62%	

== 2010 Parliamentary General Election ==
Results of the 14th parliamentary election held on 8 April 2010 for the district:

Party	Votes per Polling Division														Postal Votes	Total Votes	%	Seats
Party	Bingi -riya	Damba- deniya	Dodan -gas- landa	Galga -muwa	Hiri- yala	Katu- gampola	Kuliya- pitiya	Kurune -gala	Mawath -agama	Nikawe -ratiya	Pandu -was- nuwara	Polgaha -wela	Wariya -pola	Yapa -huwa	Postal Votes	Total Votes	%	Seats
United People's Freedom Alliance (SLFP et al.)	27,396	34,447	20,217	34,119	26,911	32,083	29,501	27,030	28,106	28,687	21,953	25,485	25,701	37,429	30,251	429,316	63.84%	10
United National Front (UNP, SLMC, DPF, SLFP(P))	16,779	15,483	12,771	12,267	13,181	17,130	19,146	16,176	14,569	14,677	16,847	12,519	9,828	13,036	9,304	213,713	31.78%	5
Democratic National Alliance (JVP et al.)	1,108	2,015	1,245	1,503	1,673	1,932	1,826	2,649	1,945	1,486	716	2,070	1,303	2,586	2,383	26,440	3.93%	0
Sri Lanka National Front	8	5	4	22	3	3	9	36	14	43	24	4	13	277	18	483	0.07%	0
United Lanka People's Party	20	19	27	45	30	27	31	24	36	32	12	34	18	67	26	448	0.07%	0
Our National Front	22	28	17	35	22	38	29	18	23	19	20	25	24	39	34	393	0.06%	0
United Democratic Front	20	13	29	15	24	22	18	22	12	20	14	17	16	20	15	277	0.04%	0
Independent 15	16	20	13	20	12	8	9	8	14	19	11	8	5	18	3	184	0.03%	0
Independent 8	12	11	11	7	6	10	11	10	12	14	7	7	3	12	1	134	0.02%	0
Independent 16	13	8	9	7	10	10	9	3	13	8	2	4	4	13	6	119	0.02%	0
Independent 14	4	7	4	4	8	12	8	6	12	21	7	10	3	2	3	111	0.02%	0
Liberal Party	1	5	1	1	6	9	0	7	4	56	2	4	0	2	3	101	0.02%	0
Independent 11	4	21	15	5	3	6	5	5	2	2	4	2	1	6	5	86	0.01%	0
Independent 1	10	7	6	5	6	7	9	1	6	4	3	0	2	4	6	76	0.01%	0
Independent 10	1	3	2	1	4	1	4	0	1	3	1	1	1	29	0	52	0.01%	0
Janasetha Peramuna	1	7	2	6	0	2	4	2	6	2	0	0	4	4	5	45	0.01%	0
Ruhuna People's Party	4	5	1	2	4	1	0	4	5	3	1	3	5	5	1	44	0.01%	0
Independent 4	2	0	2	3	1	1	1	5	4	6	3	3	7	3	2	43	0.01%	0
Independent 13	3	2	1	2	2	0	1	6	6	3	4	2	3	2	2	39	0.01%	0
Sinhalaye Mahasammatha Bhoomiputra Pakshaya	1	1	0	4	4	1	2	7	5	1	0	5	0	1	5	37	0.01%	0
Patriotic National Front	1	6	2	1	1	7	3	2	1	2	1	2	2	1	4	36	0.01%	0
Independent 2	0	1	2	3	2	5	5	0	2	3	0	0	0	7	4	34	0.01%	0
Independent 9	1	2	2	8	3	0	0	1	2	2	0	3	2	3	4	33	0.00%	0
Independent 7	1	3	2	4	1	3	1	1	3	2	1	2	2	2	2	30	0.00%	0
United Lanka Great Council	4	1	2	1	2	2	2	1	4	1	0	0	2	3	1	26	0.00%	0
Independent 5	8	2	0	2	0	0	1	4	2	1	1	1	0	3	1	26	0.00%	0
Independent 12	2	3	2	0	3	1	1	4	1	2	0	2	1	2	1	25	0.00%	0
Left Liberation Front	0	2	1	1	1	2	2	2	6	0	0	3	2	2	0	24	0.00%	0
Independent 6	1	1	7	1	2	0	0	1	2	1	0	2	0	1	2	21	0.00%	0
Sri Lanka Labour Party	0	2	2	1	1	2	1	3	1	2	0	0	2	1	3	21	0.00%	0
Independent 3	3	0	1	3	0	1	0	3	2	1	1	1	1	2	0	19	0.00%	0
Valid Votes	45,446	52,130	34,400	48,098	41,926	51,326	50,639	46,041	44,821	45,123	39,635	40,219	36,955	53,582	42,095	672,436	100.00%	15
Rejected Votes	3,350	3,003	3,358	5,319	3,832	3,575	3,558	3,012	3,806	4,975	3,092	2,835	3,118	4,884	1,413	53,130		
Total Polled	48,796	55,133	37,758	53,417	45,758	54,901	54,197	49,053	48,627	50,098	42,727	43,054	40,073	58,466	43,508	725,566		
Registered Electors	82,441	89,631	65,846	96,354	92,150	89,310	94,743	81,523	82,656	87,897	70,131	73,283	71,905	105,779		1,183,649		
Turnout	59.19%	61.51%	57.34%	55.44%	49.66%	61.47%	57.20%	60.17%	58.83%	57.00%	60.92%	58.75%	55.73%	55.27%		61.30%		

The following candidates were elected: Johnston Fernando (UPFA), 136,943 preference votes (pv); Dayasiri Jayasekara (UNF-UNP), 132,949 pv; T. B. Ekanayake (UPFA-SLFP), 112,420 pv; Anura Priyadharshana Yapa (UPFA-SLFP), 98,880 pv; K. W. Shantha Bandara (UPFA), 86,353 pv; S.B. Nawinne (UPFA-SLFP), 74,976 pv; Akila Viraj Kariyawasam (UNF-UNP), 66,477 pv; Jayarathna Herath (UPFA-SLFP), 64,645 pv; Salinda Dissanayake (UPFA-SLFP), 56,842 pv; Neranjan Wickramasinghe (UPFA), 54,572 pv; Indika Bandaranayake (UPFA), 48,665 pv; Tharanath Basnayake (UPFA), 46,079 pv; Gamini Jayawickrama Perera (UNF-UNP), 44,131 pv; Ashoka Abeysinghe (UNF), 32,990 pv; and Nimal Senarath Wijesinghe (UNF), 30,687 pv.
