= Anura Priyadharshana Yapa =

Sri Lankan politician

Hon. Anura Priyadharshana Yapa MP
- අනුර ප්‍රියදර්ශන යාපා அனுர பிரியதர்ஷனா யாப்பா
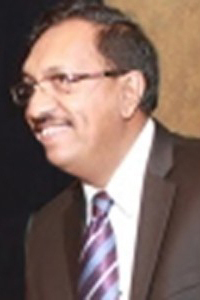

General Secretary Sri Lanka Freedom Party
- In office 22 November 2014 – 14 August 2015
- Leader: Maithripala Sirisena; Mahinda Rajapakse
- Preceded by: Maithripala Sirisena
- Succeeded by: Duminda Dissanayake

Minister of Disaster Management
- In office 4 September 2015 – 12 April 2018
- President: Maithripala Sirisena
- Prime Minister: Ranil Wickremesinghe

Member of Parliament for Kurunegala District
- In office 25 August 1994 – 24 September 2024

Personal details
- Born: 18 January 1959 (age 67) Kurunegala, Sri Lanka
- Party: Sri Lanka Freedom Party
- Other political affiliations: People's Alliance (1994–2004, since 2024); United People's Freedom Alliance (2004–2019); Sri Lanka People's Freedom Alliance (2019–2022)
- Education: Nalanda College Colombo
- Occupation: Politics
- Profession: Lawyer

Yapa Appuhamilage Anura Priyadharshana (known as Anura Priyadharshana Yapa born 18 January 1959) MP for Kurunegala former Cabinet Minister of Disaster Management in 15th Parliament of Sri Lanka. Anura Priyadharshana Yapa is also the General Secretary of the Sri Lanka Freedom Party. He was also Sri Lanka's former Cabinet Minister of Petroleum and a Member of Parliament representing the Kurunegala District.

He is a lawyer by profession and was educated at Nalanda College, Colombo.

== See also ==
- Cabinet of Sri Lanka
