= Kurunegala Polling Division =

Kurunegala
- Polling Division
- Coordinates: 7.517243°N 80.352688°E
- Country: Sri Lanka
- Province: North Western Province, Sri Lanka
- Electoral District: Kurunegala Electoral District

Area
  - Total: 249.29 km^{2} (96.25 sq mi)

Population (2012)
  - Total: 167,651
  - Density: 673/km^{2} (1,740/sq mi)
- ISO 3166 code: EC-15L

The Kurunegala Polling Division is a Polling Division in the Kurunegala Electoral District, in the North Western Province, Sri Lanka.

== Presidential Election Results ==
=== Summary ===
The winner of Kurunegala has matched the final country result 7 out of 8 times.

Year	Kurunegala	Kurunegala Electoral District	MAE %	Sri Lanka	MAE %
2019	SLPP	SLPP	1.87%	SLPP	3.27%
2015	NDF	UPFA	8.41%	NDF	2.76%
2010	UPFA	UPFA	5.69%	UPFA	0.76%
2005	UNP	UPFA	3.39%	UPFA	1.56%
1999	PA	PA	2.05%	PA	2.74%
1994	PA	PA	0.98%	PA	3.98%
1988	UNP	UNP	1.22%	UNP	1.37%
1982	UNP	UNP	3.07%	UNP	4.15%
Matches/Mean MAE	7/8	7/8	3.33%	8/8	2.57%

=== 2019 Sri Lankan Presidential Election ===
Party	Kurunegala		Kurunegala Electoral District		Sri Lanka	
Party	Votes	%	Votes	%	Votes	%
SLPP	41,940	55.68%	652,278	57.90%	6,924,255	52.25%
NDF	29,021	38.53%	416,961	37.01%	5,564,239	41.99%
NMPP	3,030	4.02%	36,178	3.21%	418,553	3.16%
Other Parties (with < 1%)	1,332	1.77%	21,193	1.88%	345,452	2.61%
Valid Votes	75,323	99.18%	1,126,610	99.25%	13,252,499	98.99%
Rejected Votes	621	0.82%	8,522	0.75%	135,452	1.01%
Total Polled	75,944	83.73%	1,135,132	85.24%	13,387,951	83.71%
Registered Electors	90,702		1,331,705		15,992,568	

=== 2015 Sri Lankan Presidential Election ===
Party	Kurunegala		Kurunegala Electoral District		Sri Lanka	
Party	Votes	%	Votes	%	Votes	%
NDF	37,895	54.28%	476,602	45.76%	6,217,162	51.28%
UPFA	31,429	45.02%	556,868	53.46%	5,768,090	47.58%
Other Parties (with < 1%)	491	0.70%	8,154	0.78%	138,200	1.14%
Valid Votes	69,815	99.17%	1,041,624	99.12%	12,123,452	98.85%
Rejected Votes	583	0.83%	9,285	0.88%	140,925	1.15%
Total Polled	70,398	78.80%	1,050,909	78.82%	12,264,377	78.69%
Registered Electors	89,332		1,333,377		15,585,942	

=== 2010 Sri Lankan Presidential Election ===
Party	Kurunegala		Kurunegala Electoral District		Sri Lanka	
Party	Votes	%	Votes	%	Votes	%
UPFA	34,912	57.31%	582,784	63.08%	6,015,934	57.88%
NDF	25,113	41.22%	327,594	35.46%	4,173,185	40.15%
Other Parties (with < 1%)	897	1.47%	13,515	1.46%	204,494	1.97%
Valid Votes	60,922	99.20%	923,893	99.29%	10,393,613	99.03%
Rejected Votes	492	0.80%	6,644	0.71%	101,838	0.97%
Total Polled	61,414	75.33%	930,537	75.59%	10,495,451	66.70%
Registered Electors	81,523		1,230,966		15,734,587	

=== 2005 Sri Lankan Presidential Election ===
Party	Kurunegala		Kurunegala Electoral District		Sri Lanka	
Party	Votes	%	Votes	%	Votes	%
UNP	29,564	50.20%	418,809	46.72%	4,706,366	48.43%
UPFA	28,791	48.88%	468,507	52.26%	4,887,152	50.29%
Other Parties (with < 1%)	541	0.92%	9,181	1.02%	123,521	1.27%
Valid Votes	58,896	98.95%	896,497	99.07%	9,717,039	98.88%
Rejected Votes	625	1.05%	8,458	0.93%	109,869	1.12%
Total Polled	59,521	77.30%	904,955	77.87%	9,826,908	69.51%
Registered Electors	77,003		1,162,099		14,136,979	

=== 1999 Sri Lankan Presidential Election ===
Party	Kurunegala		Kurunegala Electoral District		Sri Lanka	
Party	Votes	%	Votes	%	Votes	%
PA	23,715	48.48%	377,483	50.77%	4,312,157	51.12%
UNP	22,450	45.90%	326,327	43.89%	3,602,748	42.71%
JVP	1,700	3.48%	27,354	3.68%	343,927	4.08%
Other Parties (with < 1%)	1,049	2.14%	12,355	1.66%	176,679	2.09%
Valid Votes	48,914	97.80%	743,519	97.99%	8,435,754	97.69%
Rejected Votes	1,101	2.20%	15,272	2.01%	199,536	2.31%
Total Polled	50,015	75.39%	758,791	75.83%	8,635,290	72.17%
Registered Electors	66,346		1,000,624		11,965,536	

=== 1994 Sri Lankan Presidential Election ===
Party	Kurunegala		Kurunegala Electoral District		Sri Lanka	
Party	Votes	%	Votes	%	Votes	%
PA	24,685	58.39%	403,838	59.36%	4,709,205	62.28%
UNP	17,005	40.22%	266,740	39.21%	2,715,283	35.91%
Other Parties (with < 1%)	588	1.39%	9,766	1.44%	137,040	1.81%
Valid Votes	42,278	98.41%	680,344	98.48%	7,561,526	98.03%
Rejected Votes	682	1.59%	10,511	1.52%	151,706	1.97%
Total Polled	42,960	72.63%	690,855	76.97%	7,713,232	69.12%
Registered Electors	59,146		897,539		11,158,880	

=== 1988 Sri Lankan Presidential Election ===
Party	Kurunegala		Kurunegala Electoral District		Sri Lanka	
Party	Votes	%	Votes	%	Votes	%
UNP	13,598	52.32%	198,662	51.12%	2,569,199	50.43%
SLFP	11,851	45.60%	182,220	46.89%	2,289,857	44.95%
SLMP	541	2.08%	7,717	1.99%	235,701	4.63%
Valid Votes	25,990	98.86%	388,599	98.91%	5,094,754	98.24%
Rejected Votes	300	1.14%	4,281	1.09%	91,499	1.76%
Total Polled	26,290	49.42%	392,880	53.49%	5,186,256	55.87%
Registered Electors	53,193		734,453		9,283,143	

=== 1982 Sri Lankan Presidential Election ===
Party	Kurunegala		Kurunegala Electoral District		Sri Lanka	
Party	Votes	%	Votes	%	Votes	%
UNP	23,370	59.03%	345,769	55.77%	3,450,815	52.93%
SLFP	14,638	36.97%	248,479	40.08%	2,546,348	39.05%
JVP	1,300	3.28%	21,835	3.52%	273,428	4.19%
Other Parties (with < 1%)	285	0.72%	3,895	0.63%	249,460	3.83%
Valid Votes	39,593	99.26%	619,978	99.13%	6,520,156	98.78%
Rejected Votes	295	0.74%	5,431	0.87%	80,470	1.22%
Total Polled	39,888	79.06%	625,409	86.00%	6,600,626	80.15%
Registered Electors	50,454		727,202		8,235,358	

== Parliamentary Election Results ==
=== Summary ===
The winner of Kurunegala has matched the final country result 6 out of 7 times.

Year	Kurunegala	Kurunegala Electoral District	MAE %	Sri Lanka	MAE %
2015	UNP	UPFA	5.71%	UNP	2.52%
2010	UPFA	UPFA	4.43%	UPFA	2.70%
2004	UPFA	UPFA	4.57%	UPFA	3.16%
2001	UNP	UNP	3.71%	UNP	2.97%
2000	UNP	PA	5.27%	PA	4.09%
1994	PA	PA	2.26%	PA	2.57%
1989	UNP	UNP	2.68%	UNP	5.90%
Matches/Mean MAE	6/7	6/7	4.09%	7/7	3.42%

=== 2015 Sri Lankan Parliamentary Election ===
Party	Kurunegala		Kurunegala Electoral District		Sri Lanka	
Party	Votes	%	Votes	%	Votes	%
UNP	33,086	51.03%	441,275	45.87%	5,098,916	45.77%
UPFA	27,644	42.64%	474,124	49.29%	4,732,664	42.48%
JVP	3,738	5.77%	41,077	4.27%	544,154	4.88%
Other Parties (with < 1%)	364	0.56%	5,496	0.57%	83,041	0.75%
Valid Votes	64,832	95.81%	961,972	95.39%	11,140,333	95.35%
Rejected Votes	2,804	4.14%	46,036	4.56%	516,926	4.42%
Total Polled	67,669	75.75%	1,008,459	79.63%	11,684,111	77.66%
Registered Electors	89,332		1,266,443		15,044,490	

=== 2010 Sri Lankan Parliamentary Election ===
Party	Kurunegala		Kurunegala Electoral District		Sri Lanka	
Party	Votes	%	Votes	%	Votes	%
UPFA	27,030	58.75%	429,316	63.91%	4,846,388	60.38%
UNP	16,176	35.16%	213,713	31.81%	2,357,057	29.37%
DNA	2,649	5.76%	26,440	3.94%	441,251	5.50%
Other Parties (with < 1%)	153	0.33%	2,288	0.34%	34,779	0.43%
Valid Votes	46,008	93.79%	671,757	92.58%	8,026,322	96.03%
Rejected Votes	3,012	6.14%	53,130	7.32%	581,465	6.96%
Total Polled	49,053	60.17%	725,566	59.08%	8,358,246	59.29%
Registered Electors	81,523		1,228,044		14,097,690	

=== 2004 Sri Lankan Parliamentary Election ===
Party	Kurunegala		Kurunegala Electoral District		Sri Lanka	
Party	Votes	%	Votes	%	Votes	%
UPFA	23,472	44.87%	412,157	51.95%	4,223,126	45.70%
UNP	23,242	44.43%	340,768	42.95%	3,486,792	37.73%
JHU	5,347	10.22%	37,459	4.72%	552,723	5.98%
Other Parties (with < 1%)	248	0.47%	2,976	0.38%	64,640	0.70%
Valid Votes	52,309	96.13%	793,360	95.14%	9,241,931	94.52%
Rejected Votes	2,089	3.84%	40,261	4.83%	534,452	5.47%
Total Polled	54,414	73.17%	833,908	76.54%	9,777,821	75.74%
Registered Electors	74,368		1,089,482		12,909,631	

=== 2001 Sri Lankan Parliamentary Election ===
Party	Kurunegala		Kurunegala Electoral District		Sri Lanka	
Party	Votes	%	Votes	%	Votes	%
UNP	26,830	51.90%	382,768	48.59%	4,086,026	45.62%
PA	19,359	37.45%	332,775	42.24%	3,330,815	37.19%
JVP	4,656	9.01%	63,652	8.08%	815,353	9.10%
SU	520	1.01%	2,842	0.36%	50,665	0.57%
Other Parties (with < 1%)	328	0.63%	5,691	0.72%	83,105	0.93%
Valid Votes	51,693	95.97%	787,728	95.35%	8,955,844	94.77%
Rejected Votes	2,170	4.03%	38,451	4.65%	494,009	5.23%
Total Polled	53,863	75.74%	826,179	78.98%	9,449,878	76.03%
Registered Electors	71,111		1,046,102		12,428,762	

=== 2000 Sri Lankan Parliamentary Election ===
Party	Kurunegala		Kurunegala Electoral District		Sri Lanka	
Party	Votes	%	Votes	%	Votes	%
UNP	23,046	46.62%	308,106	41.86%	3,451,765	40.12%
PA	20,826	42.13%	358,794	48.75%	3,899,329	45.33%
JVP	3,054	6.18%	40,780	5.54%	518,725	6.03%
SU	1,144	2.31%	6,691	0.91%	127,859	1.49%
NUA	821	1.66%	11,927	1.62%	185,593	2.16%
Other Parties (with < 1%)	544	1.10%	9,730	1.32%	93,655	1.09%
Valid Votes	49,435	N/A	736,028	N/A	8,602,617	N/A

=== 1994 Sri Lankan Parliamentary Election ===
Party	Kurunegala		Kurunegala Electoral District		Sri Lanka	
Party	Votes	%	Votes	%	Votes	%
PA	22,173	49.52%	366,856	51.87%	3,887,805	48.94%
UNP	22,042	49.22%	332,547	47.02%	3,498,370	44.04%
Other Parties (with < 1%)	564	1.26%	7,876	1.11%	158,616	2.00%
Valid Votes	44,779	95.83%	707,279	95.92%	7,943,688	95.20%
Rejected Votes	1,947	4.17%	30,071	4.08%	400,395	4.80%
Total Polled	46,726	79.00%	737,350	82.15%	8,344,095	74.75%
Registered Electors	59,146		897,580		11,163,064	

=== 1989 Sri Lankan Parliamentary Election ===
Party	Kurunegala		Kurunegala Electoral District		Sri Lanka	
Party	Votes	%	Votes	%	Votes	%
UNP	21,692	61.24%	314,724	58.51%	2,838,005	50.71%
SLFP	11,849	33.45%	195,526	36.35%	1,785,369	31.90%
ELJP	1,086	3.07%	13,759	2.56%	67,723	1.21%
USA	508	1.43%	11,059	2.06%	141,983	2.54%
Other Parties (with < 1%)	284	0.80%	2,848	0.53%	90,480	1.62%
Valid Votes	35,419	94.43%	537,916	94.02%	5,596,468	93.87%
Rejected Votes	2,088	5.57%	34,212	5.98%	365,563	6.13%
Total Polled	37,507	72.29%	572,128	72.88%	5,962,031	63.60%
Registered Electors	51,885		784,991		9,374,164	

== Demographics ==
=== Ethnicity ===
The Kurunegala Polling Division has a Sinhalese majority (86.1%) and a significant Moor population (10.2%) . In comparison, the Kurunegala Electoral District (which contains the Kurunegala Polling Division) has a Sinhalese majority (91.4%)

Ethnicity in Kurunegala
1. Sinhalese (86.1%)
2. Moor (10.2%)
3. Sri Lankan Tamil (2.80%)
4. Other (1.00%)

=== Religion ===
The Kurunegala Polling Division has a Buddhist majority (81.9%) and a significant Muslim population (10.9%) . In comparison, the Kurunegala Electoral District (which contains the Kurunegala Polling Division) has a Buddhist majority (88.5%)

Religion in Kurunegala
1. Buddhist (81.9%)
2. Muslim (10.9%)
3. Roman Catholic (3.10%)
4. Hindu (2.20%)
5. Other Christian (1.80%)
6. Other (0.00%)
