= Namal Sudarshana =

Sri Lankan doctor and politician

Hon. Dr. Namal Sudarshana නාමල් සුදර්ශන MP

Deputy Minister of Women and Child Affairs

Member of Parliament for Kurunegala District
- Incumbent
- Assumed office 21 November 2024
- Majority: 83,418 preferential votes

Member of Parliament for Kurunegala District

Personal details
- Party: Janatha Vimukthi Peramuna
- Other political affiliations: National People's Power
- Occupation: Doctor

Namal Sudarshana is a Sri Lankan politician and a member of the National People's Power. He was elected to the parliament in the 2024 Sri Lankan parliamentary election representing Kurunegala Electoral District. He is a doctor by profession.

== Electoral history ==
Electoral history of Namal Sudarshana
Election	Constituency	Party	Alliance	Votes	Result	Ref.
2024 parliamentary	Kurunegala District	JVP	NPP	83,418	Elected	
