= Katugampola Polling Division =

Katugampola
- Polling Division
- Coordinates: 7.356062°N 80.033262°E
- Country: Sri Lanka
- Province: North Western Province, Sri Lanka
- Electoral District: Kurunegala Electoral District

Area
  - Total: 304.14 km^{2} (117.43 sq mi)

Population (2012)
  - Total: 124,225
  - Density: 408/km^{2} (1,060/sq mi)
- ISO 3166 code: EC-15H

The Katugampola Polling Division is a Polling Division in the Kurunegala Electoral District, in the North Western Province, Sri Lanka.

== Presidential Election Results ==
=== Summary ===
The winner of Katugampola has matched the final country result 7 out of 8 times.

Year	Katugampola	Kurunegala Electoral District	MAE %	Sri Lanka	MAE %
2019	SLPP	SLPP	1.24%	SLPP	6.24%
2015	UPFA	UPFA	1.61%	NDF	7.23%
2010	UPFA	UPFA	1.13%	UPFA	3.75%
2005	UPFA	UPFA	0.01%	UPFA	1.81%
1999	PA	PA	3.55%	PA	2.86%
1994	PA	PA	3.47%	PA	0.47%
1988	UNP	UNP	0.41%	UNP	1.49%
1982	UNP	UNP	3.13%	UNP	1.95%
Matches/Mean MAE	7/8	7/8	1.82%	8/8	3.23%

=== 2019 Sri Lankan Presidential Election ===
Party	Katugampola		Kurunegala Electoral District		Sri Lanka	
Party	Votes	%	Votes	%	Votes	%
SLPP	47,832	59.43%	652,278	57.90%	6,924,255	52.25%
NDF	29,041	36.08%	416,961	37.01%	5,564,239	41.99%
NMPP	2,284	2.84%	36,178	3.21%	418,553	3.16%
Other Parties (with < 1%)	1,329	1.65%	21,193	1.88%	345,452	2.61%
Valid Votes	80,486	99.36%	1,126,610	99.25%	13,252,499	98.99%
Rejected Votes	517	0.64%	8,522	0.75%	135,452	1.01%
Total Polled	81,003	84.87%	1,135,132	85.24%	13,387,951	83.71%
Registered Electors	95,449		1,331,705		15,992,568	

=== 2015 Sri Lankan Presidential Election ===
Party	Katugampola		Kurunegala Electoral District		Sri Lanka	
Party	Votes	%	Votes	%	Votes	%
UPFA	41,990	55.13%	556,868	53.46%	5,768,090	47.58%
NDF	33,655	44.19%	476,602	45.76%	6,217,162	51.28%
Other Parties (with < 1%)	518	0.68%	8,154	0.78%	138,200	1.14%
Valid Votes	76,163	99.00%	1,041,624	99.12%	12,123,452	98.85%
Rejected Votes	768	1.00%	9,285	0.88%	140,925	1.15%
Total Polled	76,931	81.40%	1,050,909	78.82%	12,264,377	78.69%
Registered Electors	94,505		1,333,377		15,585,942	

=== 2010 Sri Lankan Presidential Election ===
Party	Katugampola		Kurunegala Electoral District		Sri Lanka	
Party	Votes	%	Votes	%	Votes	%
UPFA	43,052	62.05%	582,784	63.08%	6,015,934	57.88%
NDF	25,547	36.82%	327,594	35.46%	4,173,185	40.15%
Other Parties (with < 1%)	781	1.13%	13,515	1.46%	204,494	1.97%
Valid Votes	69,380	99.44%	923,893	99.29%	10,393,613	99.03%
Rejected Votes	390	0.56%	6,644	0.71%	101,838	0.97%
Total Polled	69,770	78.12%	930,537	75.59%	10,495,451	66.70%
Registered Electors	89,310		1,230,966		15,734,587	

=== 2005 Sri Lankan Presidential Election ===
Party	Katugampola		Kurunegala Electoral District		Sri Lanka	
Party	Votes	%	Votes	%	Votes	%
UPFA	35,311	52.25%	468,507	52.26%	4,887,152	50.29%
UNP	31,580	46.73%	418,809	46.72%	4,706,366	48.43%
Other Parties (with < 1%)	691	1.02%	9,181	1.02%	123,521	1.27%
Valid Votes	67,582	99.23%	896,497	99.07%	9,717,039	98.88%
Rejected Votes	522	0.77%	8,458	0.93%	109,869	1.12%
Total Polled	68,104	79.42%	904,955	77.87%	9,826,908	69.51%
Registered Electors	85,753		1,162,099		14,136,979	

=== 1999 Sri Lankan Presidential Election ===
Party	Katugampola		Kurunegala Electoral District		Sri Lanka	
Party	Votes	%	Votes	%	Votes	%
PA	31,996	54.91%	377,483	50.77%	4,312,157	51.12%
UNP	23,680	40.63%	326,327	43.89%	3,602,748	42.71%
JVP	1,824	3.13%	27,354	3.68%	343,927	4.08%
Other Parties (with < 1%)	775	1.33%	12,355	1.66%	176,679	2.09%
Valid Votes	58,275	98.78%	743,519	97.99%	8,435,754	97.69%
Rejected Votes	718	1.22%	15,272	2.01%	199,536	2.31%
Total Polled	58,993	77.83%	758,791	75.83%	8,635,290	72.17%
Registered Electors	75,795		1,000,624		11,965,536	

=== 1994 Sri Lankan Presidential Election ===
Party	Katugampola		Kurunegala Electoral District		Sri Lanka	
Party	Votes	%	Votes	%	Votes	%
PA	33,528	63.01%	403,838	59.36%	4,709,205	62.28%
UNP	19,095	35.88%	266,740	39.21%	2,715,283	35.91%
Other Parties (with < 1%)	591	1.11%	9,766	1.44%	137,040	1.81%
Valid Votes	53,214	98.79%	680,344	98.48%	7,561,526	98.03%
Rejected Votes	651	1.21%	10,511	1.52%	151,706	1.97%
Total Polled	53,865	78.50%	690,855	76.97%	7,713,232	69.12%
Registered Electors	68,616		897,539		11,158,880	

=== 1988 Sri Lankan Presidential Election ===
Party	Katugampola		Kurunegala Electoral District		Sri Lanka	
Party	Votes	%	Votes	%	Votes	%
UNP	15,140	51.64%	198,662	51.12%	2,569,199	50.43%
SLFP	13,662	46.60%	182,220	46.89%	2,289,857	44.95%
SLMP	515	1.76%	7,717	1.99%	235,701	4.63%
Valid Votes	29,317	98.69%	388,599	98.91%	5,094,754	98.24%
Rejected Votes	389	1.31%	4,281	1.09%	91,499	1.76%
Total Polled	29,706	48.19%	392,880	53.49%	5,186,256	55.87%
Registered Electors	61,644		734,453		9,283,143	

=== 1982 Sri Lankan Presidential Election ===
Party	Katugampola		Kurunegala Electoral District		Sri Lanka	
Party	Votes	%	Votes	%	Votes	%
UNP	25,597	52.32%	345,769	55.77%	3,450,815	52.93%
SLFP	21,050	43.03%	248,479	40.08%	2,546,348	39.05%
JVP	2,003	4.09%	21,835	3.52%	273,428	4.19%
Other Parties (with < 1%)	274	0.56%	3,895	0.63%	249,460	3.83%
Valid Votes	48,924	99.34%	619,978	99.13%	6,520,156	98.78%
Rejected Votes	324	0.66%	5,431	0.87%	80,470	1.22%
Total Polled	49,248	86.15%	625,409	86.00%	6,600,626	80.15%
Registered Electors	57,167		727,202		8,235,358	

== Parliamentary Election Results ==
=== Summary ===
The winner of Katugampola has matched the final country result 5 out of 7 times. Hence, Katugampola is a Weak Bellwether for Parliamentary Elections.

Year	Katugampola	Kurunegala Electoral District	MAE %	Sri Lanka	MAE %
2015	UPFA	UPFA	1.83%	UNP	4.55%
2010	UPFA	UPFA	1.37%	UPFA	2.60%
2004	UPFA	UPFA	0.86%	UPFA	4.67%
2001	PA	UNP	3.87%	UNP	4.08%
2000	PA	PA	2.66%	PA	3.41%
1994	PA	PA	3.26%	PA	3.19%
1989	UNP	UNP	1.01%	UNP	5.53%
Matches/Mean MAE	5/7	6/7	2.12%	7/7	4.01%

=== 2015 Sri Lankan Parliamentary Election ===
Party	Katugampola		Kurunegala Electoral District		Sri Lanka	
Party	Votes	%	Votes	%	Votes	%
UPFA	36,543	51.60%	474,124	49.29%	4,732,664	42.48%
UNP	31,465	44.43%	441,275	45.87%	5,098,916	45.77%
JVP	2,559	3.61%	41,077	4.27%	544,154	4.88%
Other Parties (with < 1%)	249	0.35%	5,496	0.57%	83,041	0.75%
Valid Votes	70,816	95.84%	961,972	95.39%	11,140,333	95.35%
Rejected Votes	3,043	4.12%	46,036	4.56%	516,926	4.42%
Total Polled	73,888	78.18%	1,008,459	79.63%	11,684,111	77.66%
Registered Electors	94,505		1,266,443		15,044,490	

=== 2010 Sri Lankan Parliamentary Election ===
Party	Katugampola		Kurunegala Electoral District		Sri Lanka	
Party	Votes	%	Votes	%	Votes	%
UPFA	32,083	62.56%	429,316	63.91%	4,846,388	60.38%
UNP	17,130	33.40%	213,713	31.81%	2,357,057	29.37%
DNA	1,932	3.77%	26,440	3.94%	441,251	5.50%
Other Parties (with < 1%)	136	0.27%	2,288	0.34%	34,779	0.43%
Valid Votes	51,281	93.41%	671,757	92.58%	8,026,322	96.03%
Rejected Votes	3,575	6.51%	53,130	7.32%	581,465	6.96%
Total Polled	54,901	61.47%	725,566	59.08%	8,358,246	59.29%
Registered Electors	89,310		1,228,044		14,097,690	

=== 2004 Sri Lankan Parliamentary Election ===
Party	Katugampola		Kurunegala Electoral District		Sri Lanka	
Party	Votes	%	Votes	%	Votes	%
UPFA	31,388	52.54%	412,157	51.95%	4,223,126	45.70%
UNP	24,936	41.74%	340,768	42.95%	3,486,792	37.73%
JHU	3,212	5.38%	37,459	4.72%	552,723	5.98%
Other Parties (with < 1%)	210	0.35%	2,976	0.38%	64,640	0.70%
Valid Votes	59,746	95.16%	793,360	95.14%	9,241,931	94.52%
Rejected Votes	3,021	4.81%	40,261	4.83%	534,452	5.47%
Total Polled	62,788	75.06%	833,908	76.54%	9,777,821	75.74%
Registered Electors	83,645		1,089,482		12,909,631	

=== 2001 Sri Lankan Parliamentary Election ===
Party	Katugampola		Kurunegala Electoral District		Sri Lanka	
Party	Votes	%	Votes	%	Votes	%
PA	27,964	46.30%	332,775	42.24%	3,330,815	37.19%
UNP	26,711	44.23%	382,768	48.59%	4,086,026	45.62%
JVP	5,140	8.51%	63,652	8.08%	815,353	9.10%
Other Parties (with < 1%)	582	0.96%	8,533	1.08%	133,770	1.49%
Valid Votes	60,397	95.71%	787,728	95.35%	8,955,844	94.77%
Rejected Votes	2,709	4.29%	38,451	4.65%	494,009	5.23%
Total Polled	63,106	78.67%	826,179	78.98%	9,449,878	76.03%
Registered Electors	80,221		1,046,102		12,428,762	

=== 2000 Sri Lankan Parliamentary Election ===
Party	Katugampola		Kurunegala Electoral District		Sri Lanka	
Party	Votes	%	Votes	%	Votes	%
PA	30,492	52.31%	358,794	48.75%	3,899,329	45.33%
UNP	23,173	39.75%	308,106	41.86%	3,451,765	40.12%
JVP	2,877	4.94%	40,780	5.54%	518,725	6.03%
Other Parties (with < 1%)	1,116	1.91%	16,421	2.23%	221,514	2.57%
NUA	633	1.09%	11,927	1.62%	185,593	2.16%
Valid Votes	58,291	N/A	736,028	N/A	8,602,617	N/A

=== 1994 Sri Lankan Parliamentary Election ===
Party	Katugampola		Kurunegala Electoral District		Sri Lanka	
Party	Votes	%	Votes	%	Votes	%
PA	30,192	55.12%	366,856	51.87%	3,887,805	48.94%
UNP	23,922	43.67%	332,547	47.02%	3,498,370	44.04%
Other Parties (with < 1%)	665	1.21%	7,876	1.11%	158,616	2.00%
Valid Votes	54,779	96.08%	707,279	95.92%	7,943,688	95.20%
Rejected Votes	2,235	3.92%	30,071	4.08%	400,395	4.80%
Total Polled	57,014	83.09%	737,350	82.15%	8,344,095	74.75%
Registered Electors	68,616		897,580		11,163,064	

=== 1989 Sri Lankan Parliamentary Election ===
Party	Katugampola		Kurunegala Electoral District		Sri Lanka	
Party	Votes	%	Votes	%	Votes	%
UNP	25,786	57.80%	314,724	58.51%	2,838,005	50.71%
SLFP	16,903	37.89%	195,526	36.35%	1,785,369	31.90%
USA	1,043	2.34%	11,059	2.06%	141,983	2.54%
ELJP	658	1.48%	13,759	2.56%	67,723	1.21%
Other Parties (with < 1%)	219	0.49%	2,848	0.53%	90,480	1.62%
Valid Votes	44,609	94.63%	537,916	94.02%	5,596,468	93.87%
Rejected Votes	2,531	5.37%	34,212	5.98%	365,563	6.13%
Total Polled	47,140	77.24%	572,128	72.88%	5,962,031	63.60%
Registered Electors	61,031		784,991		9,374,164	

== Demographics ==
=== Ethnicity ===
The Katugampola Polling Division has a Sinhalese majority (93.1%) . In comparison, the Kurunegala Electoral District (which contains the Katugampola Polling Division) has a Sinhalese majority (91.4%)

Ethnicity in Katugampola
1. Sinhalese (93.1%)
2. Moor (5.70%)
3. Sri Lankan Tamil (1.00%)
4. Other (0.20%)

=== Religion ===
The Katugampola Polling Division has a Buddhist majority (86.7%) . In comparison, the Kurunegala Electoral District (which contains the Katugampola Polling Division) has a Buddhist majority (88.5%)

Religion in Katugampola
1. Buddhist (86.7%)
2. Roman Catholic (6.10%)
3. Muslim (5.80%)
4. Other (1.40%)
