= Yapahuwa Polling Division =

Yapahuwa
- Polling Division
- Coordinates: 7.822008°N 80.370418°E
- Country: Sri Lanka
- Province: North Western Province, Sri Lanka
- Electoral District: Kurunegala Electoral District

Area
  - Total: 849.44 km^{2} (327.97 sq mi)

Population (2012)
  - Total: 156,502
  - Density: 184/km^{2} (480/sq mi)
- ISO 3166 code: EC-15C

The Yapahuwa Polling Division is a Polling Division in the Kurunegala Electoral District, in the North Western Province, Sri Lanka.

== Presidential Election Results ==
=== Summary ===
Year	Yapahuwa	Kurunegala Electoral District	MAE %	Sri Lanka	MAE %
2019	SLPP	SLPP	1.90%	SLPP	6.94%
2015	UPFA	UPFA	3.80%	NDF	9.42%
2010	UPFA	UPFA	2.24%	UPFA	7.14%
2005	UPFA	UPFA	0.98%	UPFA	2.80%
1999	PA	PA	1.26%	PA	1.93%
1994	PA	PA	0.73%	PA	3.73%
1988	SLFP	UNP	4.34%	UNP	4.73%
1982	UNP	UNP	1.04%	UNP	1.51%
Matches/Mean MAE	6/8	7/8	2.04%	8/8	4.77%

=== 2019 Sri Lankan Presidential Election ===
Party	Yapahuwa		Kurunegala Electoral District		Sri Lanka	
Party	Votes	%	Votes	%	Votes	%
SLPP	55,823	59.86%	652,278	57.90%	6,924,255	52.25%
NDF	32,581	34.93%	416,961	37.01%	5,564,239	41.99%
NMPP	2,944	3.16%	36,178	3.21%	418,553	3.16%
Other Parties (with < 1%)	1,914	2.05%	21,193	1.88%	345,452	2.61%
Valid Votes	93,262	99.27%	1,126,610	99.25%	13,252,499	98.99%
Rejected Votes	683	0.73%	8,522	0.75%	135,452	1.01%
Total Polled	93,945	84.70%	1,135,132	85.24%	13,387,951	83.71%
Registered Electors	110,915		1,331,705		15,992,568	

=== 2015 Sri Lankan Presidential Election ===
Party	Yapahuwa		Kurunegala Electoral District		Sri Lanka	
Party	Votes	%	Votes	%	Votes	%
UPFA	49,289	57.25%	556,868	53.46%	5,768,090	47.58%
NDF	36,058	41.88%	476,602	45.76%	6,217,162	51.28%
Other Parties (with < 1%)	743	0.86%	8,154	0.78%	138,200	1.14%
Valid Votes	86,090	99.25%	1,041,624	99.12%	12,123,452	98.85%
Rejected Votes	654	0.75%	9,285	0.88%	140,925	1.15%
Total Polled	86,744	76.19%	1,050,909	78.82%	12,264,377	78.69%
Registered Electors	113,858		1,333,377		15,585,942	

=== 2010 Sri Lankan Presidential Election ===
Party	Yapahuwa		Kurunegala Electoral District		Sri Lanka	
Party	Votes	%	Votes	%	Votes	%
UPFA	49,854	65.24%	582,784	63.08%	6,015,934	57.88%
NDF	25,199	32.98%	327,594	35.46%	4,173,185	40.15%
Other Parties (with < 1%)	1,365	1.79%	13,515	1.46%	204,494	1.97%
Valid Votes	76,418	99.35%	923,893	99.29%	10,393,613	99.03%
Rejected Votes	502	0.65%	6,644	0.71%	101,838	0.97%
Total Polled	76,920	72.72%	930,537	75.59%	10,495,451	66.70%
Registered Electors	105,779		1,230,966		15,734,587	

=== 2005 Sri Lankan Presidential Election ===
Party	Yapahuwa		Kurunegala Electoral District		Sri Lanka	
Party	Votes	%	Votes	%	Votes	%
UPFA	40,136	53.29%	468,507	52.26%	4,887,152	50.29%
UNP	34,469	45.76%	418,809	46.72%	4,706,366	48.43%
Other Parties (with < 1%)	717	0.95%	9,181	1.02%	123,521	1.27%
Valid Votes	75,322	99.04%	896,497	99.07%	9,717,039	98.88%
Rejected Votes	728	0.96%	8,458	0.93%	109,869	1.12%
Total Polled	76,050	75.67%	904,955	77.87%	9,826,908	69.51%
Registered Electors	100,497		1,162,099		14,136,979	

=== 1999 Sri Lankan Presidential Election ===
Party	Yapahuwa		Kurunegala Electoral District		Sri Lanka	
Party	Votes	%	Votes	%	Votes	%
PA	31,252	49.22%	377,483	50.77%	4,312,157	51.12%
UNP	28,525	44.92%	326,327	43.89%	3,602,748	42.71%
JVP	2,714	4.27%	27,354	3.68%	343,927	4.08%
Other Parties (with < 1%)	1,008	1.59%	12,355	1.66%	176,679	2.09%
Valid Votes	63,499	98.04%	743,519	97.99%	8,435,754	97.69%
Rejected Votes	1,269	1.96%	15,272	2.01%	199,536	2.31%
Total Polled	64,768	74.50%	758,791	75.83%	8,635,290	72.17%
Registered Electors	86,938		1,000,624		11,965,536	

=== 1994 Sri Lankan Presidential Election ===
Party	Yapahuwa		Kurunegala Electoral District		Sri Lanka	
Party	Votes	%	Votes	%	Votes	%
PA	33,582	58.62%	403,838	59.36%	4,709,205	62.28%
UNP	22,893	39.96%	266,740	39.21%	2,715,283	35.91%
Other Parties (with < 1%)	808	1.41%	9,766	1.44%	137,040	1.81%
Valid Votes	57,283	98.35%	680,344	98.48%	7,561,526	98.03%
Rejected Votes	962	1.65%	10,511	1.52%	151,706	1.97%
Total Polled	58,245	76.55%	690,855	76.97%	7,713,232	69.12%
Registered Electors	76,083		897,539		11,158,880	

=== 1988 Sri Lankan Presidential Election ===
Party	Yapahuwa		Kurunegala Electoral District		Sri Lanka	
Party	Votes	%	Votes	%	Votes	%
SLFP	7,950	49.71%	182,220	46.89%	2,289,857	44.95%
UNP	7,250	45.33%	198,662	51.12%	2,569,199	50.43%
SLMP	793	4.96%	7,717	1.99%	235,701	4.63%
Valid Votes	15,993	98.72%	388,599	98.91%	5,094,754	98.24%
Rejected Votes	207	1.28%	4,281	1.09%	91,499	1.76%
Total Polled	16,200	100.00%	392,880	53.49%	5,186,256	55.87%
Registered Electors	16,200		734,453		9,283,143	

=== 1982 Sri Lankan Presidential Election ===
Party	Yapahuwa		Kurunegala Electoral District		Sri Lanka	
Party	Votes	%	Votes	%	Votes	%
UNP	27,489	54.41%	345,769	55.77%	3,450,815	52.93%
SLFP	20,566	40.71%	248,479	40.08%	2,546,348	39.05%
JVP	2,141	4.24%	21,835	3.52%	273,428	4.19%
Other Parties (with < 1%)	322	0.64%	3,895	0.63%	249,460	3.83%
Valid Votes	50,518	99.38%	619,978	99.13%	6,520,156	98.78%
Rejected Votes	317	0.62%	5,431	0.87%	80,470	1.22%
Total Polled	50,835	86.86%	625,409	86.00%	6,600,626	80.15%
Registered Electors	58,528		727,202		8,235,358	

== Parliamentary Election Results ==
=== Summary ===
Year	Yapahuwa	Kurunegala Electoral District	MAE %	Sri Lanka	MAE %
2015	UPFA	UPFA	3.70%	UNP	6.27%
2010	UPFA	UPFA	6.27%	UPFA	7.28%
2004	UPFA	UPFA	2.26%	UPFA	6.38%
2001	UNP	UNP	0.67%	UNP	2.77%
2000	PA	PA	1.27%	PA	2.96%
1994	PA	PA	0.97%	PA	2.68%
1989	UNP	UNP	3.25%	UNP	5.38%
Matches/Mean MAE	6/7	6/7	2.63%	7/7	4.82%

=== 2015 Sri Lankan Parliamentary Election ===
Party	Yapahuwa		Kurunegala Electoral District		Sri Lanka	
Party	Votes	%	Votes	%	Votes	%
UPFA	41,149	52.90%	474,124	49.29%	4,732,664	42.48%
UNP	32,483	41.76%	441,275	45.87%	5,098,916	45.77%
JVP	3,882	4.99%	41,077	4.27%	544,154	4.88%
Other Parties (with < 1%)	268	0.34%	5,496	0.57%	83,041	0.75%
Valid Votes	77,782	94.54%	961,972	95.39%	11,140,333	95.35%
Rejected Votes	4,431	5.39%	46,036	4.56%	516,926	4.42%
Total Polled	82,272	72.26%	1,008,459	79.63%	11,684,111	77.66%
Registered Electors	113,858		1,266,443		15,044,490	

=== 2010 Sri Lankan Parliamentary Election ===
Party	Yapahuwa		Kurunegala Electoral District		Sri Lanka	
Party	Votes	%	Votes	%	Votes	%
UPFA	37,429	69.95%	429,316	63.91%	4,846,388	60.38%
UNP	13,036	24.36%	213,713	31.81%	2,357,057	29.37%
DNA	2,586	4.83%	26,440	3.94%	441,251	5.50%
Other Parties (with < 1%)	457	0.85%	2,288	0.34%	34,779	0.43%
Valid Votes	53,508	91.52%	671,757	92.58%	8,026,322	96.03%
Rejected Votes	4,884	8.35%	53,130	7.32%	581,465	6.96%
Total Polled	58,466	55.27%	725,566	59.08%	8,358,246	59.29%
Registered Electors	105,779		1,228,044		14,097,690	

=== 2004 Sri Lankan Parliamentary Election ===
Party	Yapahuwa		Kurunegala Electoral District		Sri Lanka	
Party	Votes	%	Votes	%	Votes	%
UPFA	37,155	55.45%	412,157	51.95%	4,223,126	45.70%
UNP	28,281	42.20%	340,768	42.95%	3,486,792	37.73%
JHU	1,387	2.07%	37,459	4.72%	552,723	5.98%
Other Parties (with < 1%)	188	0.28%	2,976	0.38%	64,640	0.70%
Valid Votes	67,011	95.32%	793,360	95.14%	9,241,931	94.52%
Rejected Votes	3,271	4.65%	40,261	4.83%	534,452	5.47%
Total Polled	70,300	72.61%	833,908	76.54%	9,777,821	75.74%
Registered Electors	96,817		1,089,482		12,909,631	

=== 2001 Sri Lankan Parliamentary Election ===
Party	Yapahuwa		Kurunegala Electoral District		Sri Lanka	
Party	Votes	%	Votes	%	Votes	%
UNP	32,601	48.31%	382,768	48.59%	4,086,026	45.62%
PA	27,843	41.26%	332,775	42.24%	3,330,815	37.19%
JVP	6,417	9.51%	63,652	8.08%	815,353	9.10%
Other Parties (with < 1%)	628	0.93%	8,533	1.08%	133,770	1.49%
Valid Votes	67,489	95.78%	787,728	95.35%	8,955,844	94.77%
Rejected Votes	2,972	4.22%	38,451	4.65%	494,009	5.23%
Total Polled	70,461	75.97%	826,179	78.98%	9,449,878	76.03%
Registered Electors	92,750		1,046,102		12,428,762	

=== 2000 Sri Lankan Parliamentary Election ===
Party	Yapahuwa		Kurunegala Electoral District		Sri Lanka	
Party	Votes	%	Votes	%	Votes	%
PA	30,832	48.18%	358,794	48.75%	3,899,329	45.33%
UNP	28,227	44.11%	308,106	41.86%	3,451,765	40.12%
JVP	3,824	5.98%	40,780	5.54%	518,725	6.03%
Other Parties (with < 1%)	1,104	1.73%	28,348	3.85%	407,107	4.73%
Valid Votes	63,987	N/A	736,028	N/A	8,602,617	N/A

=== 1994 Sri Lankan Parliamentary Election ===
Party	Yapahuwa		Kurunegala Electoral District		Sri Lanka	
Party	Votes	%	Votes	%	Votes	%
PA	30,277	50.87%	366,856	51.87%	3,887,805	48.94%
UNP	28,549	47.97%	332,547	47.02%	3,498,370	44.04%
Other Parties (with < 1%)	690	1.16%	7,876	1.11%	158,616	2.00%
Valid Votes	59,516	95.14%	707,279	95.92%	7,943,688	95.20%
Rejected Votes	3,041	4.86%	30,071	4.08%	400,395	4.80%
Total Polled	62,557	82.22%	737,350	82.15%	8,344,095	74.75%
Registered Electors	76,083		897,580		11,163,064	

=== 1989 Sri Lankan Parliamentary Election ===
Party	Yapahuwa		Kurunegala Electoral District		Sri Lanka	
Party	Votes	%	Votes	%	Votes	%
UNP	23,615	60.68%	314,724	58.51%	2,838,005	50.71%
SLFP	12,187	31.32%	195,526	36.35%	1,785,369	31.90%
USA	2,707	6.96%	11,059	2.06%	141,983	2.54%
Other Parties (with < 1%)	406	1.04%	16,607	3.09%	158,203	2.83%
Valid Votes	38,915	91.72%	537,916	94.02%	5,596,468	93.87%
Rejected Votes	3,511	8.28%	34,212	5.98%	365,563	6.13%
Total Polled	42,426	64.33%	572,128	72.88%	5,962,031	63.60%
Registered Electors	65,948		784,991		9,374,164	

== Demographics ==
=== Ethnicity ===
The Yapahuwa Polling Division has a Sinhalese majority (97.5%). The Kurunegala Electoral District (which contains the Yapahuwa Polling Division) has a Sinhalese majority (91.4%)

Ethnicity in Yapahuwa
1. Sinhalese (97.5%)
2. Moor (2.10%)
3. Other (0.40%)

=== Religion ===
The Yapahuwa Polling Division has a Buddhist majority (96.8%). The Kurunegala Electoral District (which contains the Yapahuwa Polling Division) has a Buddhist majority (88.5%)

Religion in Yapahuwa
1. Buddhist (96.8%)
2. Muslim (2.20%)
3. Other (1.00%)
