= Indika Bandaranayake =

Sri Lankan politician

Hon. Indika Bandaranayake MP

Deputy Minister of Housing and Construction
- In office 2015–2019

Deputy Minister of Local Government & Provincial Councils
- In office 2010 – 12 January 2015

Deputy Minister of Environment & Natural Resources
- In office 2001–2004

Member of Parliament for Kurunegala District
- In office 2001–2020

Personal details
- Born: September 7, 1972 (age 53)
- Party: Sri Lanka Freedom Party
- Other political affiliations: United People's Freedom Alliance

Indika Bandaranayake (born September 7, 1972) is a Sri Lankan politician, a member of the Parliament of Sri Lanka and he is the former Deputy Minister of Housing and Construction.
