= Dharmapriya Dissanayake =

Sri Lankan politician

Hon. Dharmapriya Dissanayake ධර්මප්‍රිය දිසානායක MP

Member of Parliament for Kurunegala District
- Incumbent
- Assumed office 21 November 2024
- Majority: 68,580 preferential votes

Member of Parliament for Kurunegala District

Personal details
- Party: Janatha Vimukthi Peramuna
- Other political affiliations: National People's Power
- Occupation: Businessman

Dharmapriya Dissanayake is a Sri Lankan politician and a member of the National People's Power. He was elected to the parliament in the 2024 Sri Lankan parliamentary election representing Kurunegala Electoral District. He is a businessman by profession and a former local council member of Kurunegala District.

== Electoral history ==
Electoral history of Dharmapriya Dissanayake
Election	Constituency	Party	Alliance	Votes	Result	Ref.
2024 parliamentary	Kurunegala District	JVP	NPP	68,580	Elected	
