= Bandula Basnayake =

Sri Lankan politician (born 1947)

Hon. Bandula Basnayake

Deputy Minister of Environment & Natural Resources
- In office 2004–2007

Non-Cabinet Minister of Sports
- In office 2007–2010

Member of Parliament for Kurunegala District
- In office 1994–2000
- In office 2004–2010

Personal details
- Born: 20 January 1947 (age 79)
- Party: Sri Lanka Freedom Party
- Other political affiliations: United People's Freedom Alliance

Basnayake Mudiyanselage Bandula Basnayake (born 20 January 1947) is a Sri Lankan politician, a former member of the Parliament of Sri Lanka and a former government minister.
