= Nalin Bandara =

Sri Lankan politician

Hon. Nalin Bandara MP
- නලීන් බණ්ඩාර நளின் பண்டார

Member of Parliament for Kurunegala District
- Incumbent
- Assumed office 2013

Personal details
- Born: Nalin Nilantha Bandara Wijerathna Jayamaha Hitihamilage; 5 June 1974 (age 52) Udubaddawa, Sri Lanka
- Party: Samagi Jana Balawegaya (since 2020); United National Party (until 2020)
- Spouse: Madushani Shehara
- Children: 2
- Education: Central College Kuliyapitiya

Nalin Nilantha Bandara Wijerathna Jayamaha Hitihamilage (born 5 June 1974) is a Sri Lankan politician and current member of parliament for the Kurunegala District. He is a member of the Samagi Jana Balawegaya and was formerly a member of the United National Party.
