= Salinda Dissanayake =

Sri Lankan politician (1958–2019)

Hon. Salinda Dissanayake MP

Minister of Land Development & Minor Export Agricultural Crops
- In office 2000–2001

Deputy Minister of River Basin & Rajarata Development
- In office 2004–2007

Non-Cabinet Minister of Coconut Development
- In office 2007–2010

Deputy Minister of Plantation & Industries
- In office 2010 – 12 January 2015

Member of Parliament for Kurunegala District
- In office 1994 – 5 August 2019
- Succeeded by: D. B. Herath

Personal details
- Born: 1 May 1958 Kurunagala, Ceylon
- Died: 5 August 2019 (aged 61) Kurunagala, Sri Lanka
- Party: Sri Lanka Freedom Party
- Other political affiliations: United People's Freedom Alliance
- Education: Kingswood College, Kandy
- Profession: Engineer

Salinda Dissanayake (1 May 1958 – 5 August 2019) was a Sri Lankan politician. He was member of Parliament from Kurunegala District and Sri Lankan Non-Cabinet Minister of Nation Building.
