= Attempted assassination of Chandrika Kumaratunga =

1999 attempted murder of 5th President of Sri Lanka

- Location: 6°54′57″N 79°51′50″E; Colombo, Sri Lanka
- Date: December 18, 1999; 26 years ago
- Attack type: Suicide bombing
- Deaths: 34
- Injuries: 105+
- Perpetrator: Liberation Tigers of Tamil Eelam
- Charges: 110 charges including aiding and abetting in murder of president, conspiracy, and terrorist attack
- Verdict: 30 years in prison (served 22 years; pardoned by President Ranil Wickremesinghe)
- Convicted: Velayutham Varatharajah; Chandra Ragupathy
- Judge: High Court Judge Padmini Ranawaka Gunathilake

On December 18, 1999, the 5th President of Sri Lanka, Chandrika Bandaranaike Kumaratunga, was wounded in a coordinated bomb blast that was attempting to take her life. Kumaratunga had been president for one-term, and was campaigning for her second term in office in the 1999 presidential election. Upon leaving her final election rally at Town Hall in the country's capital of Colombo, she was caught in an explosive attack planned by the Liberation Tigers of Tamil Eelam.

Kumaratunga survived, but was injured, permanently losing vision in her right eye due to optic nerve damage. 34 others were killed in the blast, with an additional 105+ who were injured. In the days following the attack, Kumaratunga won the election, defeating Ranil Wickremesinghe. Just a few short days after the attack, on December 22, 1999, she was sworn in for her second term in office.

== Background ==
=== President Chandrika Kumaratunga ===
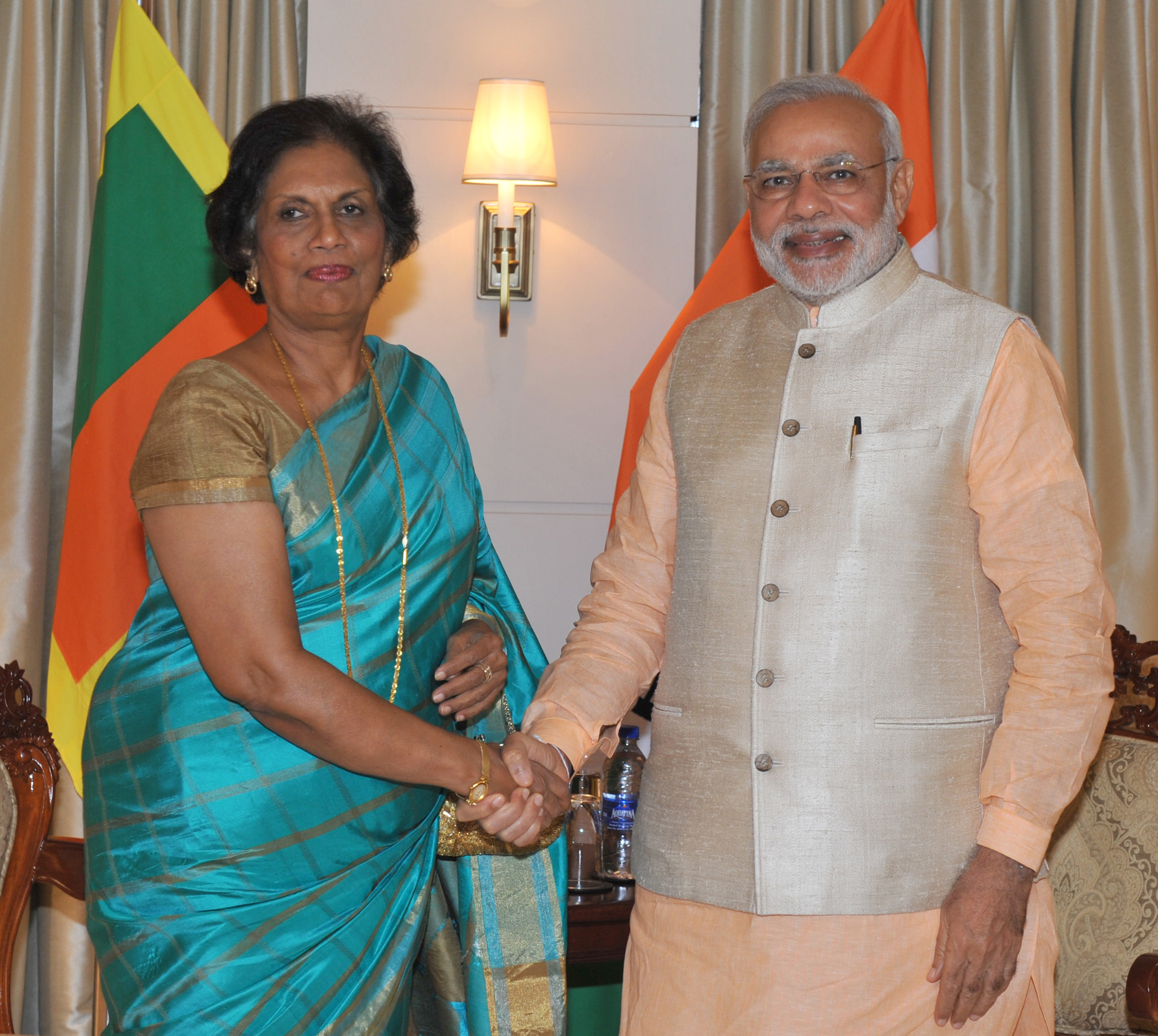
President Chandrika Kumaratunga with Indian Prime Minister Narendra Modi in 2015

Chandrika Bandaranaike Kumaratunga is a Sri Lankan politician who served as the 5th President of Sri Lanka from November 12, 1994, to November 19, 2005. Kumaratunga was the country's first and only female president to date, and the country's second female prime minister. Her mother, Sirimavo Bandaranaike, was the first female prime minister of the country, and the first elected female head-of-state in the world. Prior to both of their terms, Kumaratunga's father, S. W. R. D. Bandaranaike, had also served as prime minister, until his assassination in 1959 at the hands of a rogue Buddhist monk.

In 1978, she married Vijaya Kumaratunga, one of the most popular icons in all of Sri Lankan cinema. Vijaya founded a political party known as Sri Lanka Mahajana Pakshaya, which he led until he himself was assassinated in 1988 by communist insurgents during the JVP Communist Insurrection. The couple had 2 children together.

During her tenure as president, Kumaratunga led the Sri Lanka Freedom Party, which was founded by her father. While campaigning for her first-term in office, her opponent, Gamini Dissanayake, was assassinated by the Liberation Tigers of Tamil Eelam. Dissanayake's party, the United National Party (the other of two prominent political parties in Sri Lanka), convinced his wife Srima Dissanayake to run in his place. Chandrika won the presidential election gaining 62.28% of the vote. Becoming the first female President of Sri Lanka, she appointed her mother to succeed her as prime minister. It was her mother's third-term in office as prime minister.

Kumaratunga's presidency was defined by large economic reforms and privatization of many government corporations, increasing the recognition and acceptance of Sri Lanka on the international stage with her appointed Foreign Minister Lakshman Kadirgamar, and conciliatory moves toward the separatist Tamil Tigers (LTTE) in an attempt to end the ongoing civil war. She was the first Sinhalese president who was willing to listen to and address the issues faced by the Tamil minority community.

=== Liberation Tigers of Tamil Eelam ===
The Liberation Tigers of Tamil Eelam (LTTE) were a Tamil militant separatist organization that was based in northeastern Sri Lanka. The LTTE fought to create an independent Tamil state, which they called Tamil Eelam, in the north-east of the island where the majority of Tamils resided. They cited the continuous discrimination and violent persecution against Sri Lankan Tamils by the Sinhalese dominated Sri Lankan Government as their motive.

Founded in May 1976 by Velupillai Prabhakaran, the LTTE was involved in armed clashes against the Sri Lankan government and its armed forces. Initially starting out as a guerrilla force, the LTTE increasingly came to resemble that of a conventional fighting force with a well-developed military wing that included a navy, an airborne unit, an intelligence wing, and a specialised suicide attack unit. The LTTE popularised and perfected the use of a suicide vest as a weapon, a tactic now used by many current militant organizations.

In the years during and since the civil war, many nations have recognized the LTTE as a terrorist organization. Nations that have designated the LTTE as a terrorist group are: European Union, Canada, India, Malaysia, Sri Lanka, United Kingdom, and United States.

On December 18, 1999, the LTTE sent an unidentified female suicide bomber to target and assassinate President Kumaratunga. This attempt ultimately failed, although it wounded more than 105 people and killed an additional 34.

== Attack ==
On December 18, 1999, President Kumaratunga was campaigning for her second term in office in the 1999 presidential election. Just two days before election day, upon leaving her final election rally at Town Hall in the country's capital of Colombo, she was caught in an explosive attack planned by the Liberation Tigers of Tamil Eelam. The terrorist organization had sent an unidentified female suicide bomber, who tried to leap over a barricade. Several of the president's security guards restrained the woman who then detonated a bomb she had strapped to her body as the president was walking towards her vehicle. Cameras were rolling as the bright orange explosion blinded many nearby. The President was found crouched on the pavement with blood pouring from her eyes. One piece of shrapnel had entered the bridge of her nose, damaging her optic nerve. Another pellet lodged in her neck, and a third projectile came within a quarter-inch of her brain. People quickly surrounded her in an attempt to pull her away, while she was still directing operations to get civilians to safety.

Kumaratunga survived, but permanently lost vision in her right eye due to the shrapnel which damaged her optic nerve. To this day, Kumaratunga wears a glass eye. 34 others were killed in the blast, with an additional 105+ who were injured. Among the dead were the bomber, several of Kumaratunga's security guards, Sri Lanka's most senior policeman T. N. De Silva, three ministers, and Kumaratunga's chauffeur. Several foreign journalists, including a Japanese television crew and a Reuters photographer were among the injured.

== Aftermath ==
Shortly after the blast, another bomb exploded at a gathering of the main opposition United National Party in Ja-Ela, a Colombo suburb, killing 12 more people, including former Major General Lucky Algama, and wounding more than 70 people. The suicide bomber for that incident was later identified as Skandaraja Ashoka, working for the Liberation Tigers of Tamil Eelam.

Hundreds of troops were deployed on the streets of Colombo, and the Sri Lankan Defence Ministry announced an indefinite curfew in the capital and surrounding districts such as Gampaha following the attacks. Police and army sealed off the area around the site and the road leading to a private hospital where Kumaratunga was taken.

While in the hospital, Kumaratunga feared that the people would retaliate against the Tamil minorities. She urged her secretary to let the public know that she is fine, and to tell them the following, "I know that when people are excited and wanting violence, when they go to a place of worship, they do become calm. I said, 'Tell them my only request is that first they should remain calm and don't try to harm anybody, and secondly that they should all go to their places of worship and pray for me.'" There was no violent riot that night.

Kumaratunga's opponent in the election, Ranil Wickremesinghe, was due to address the UNP's last rally in Colombo the day after, but showed up only briefly to thank the crowd and left.

While the unidentified female suicide bomber perished in the bomb blast, others were arrested for aiding and abetting in the act. Velayutham Varatharajah and Chandra Ragupathy were both charged with 30 years in prison. In 2021, President Ranil Wickremesinghe pardoned the two, while pardoning a total of eight Tamil prisoners. These prisoners were all arrested under Sri Lanka's Prevention of Terrorism Act. Under Article 34 of the Constitution of Sri Lanka, the President is assigned the power to grant amnesty to a person convicted by a court of Sri Lanka. President Wickremesinghe gained consent from President Kumaratunga before proceeding with the pardons.
