= Assassination of Vijaya Kumaratunga =

1989 murder in Colombo, Sri Lanka

- Part of the 1987-1989 JVP insurgency
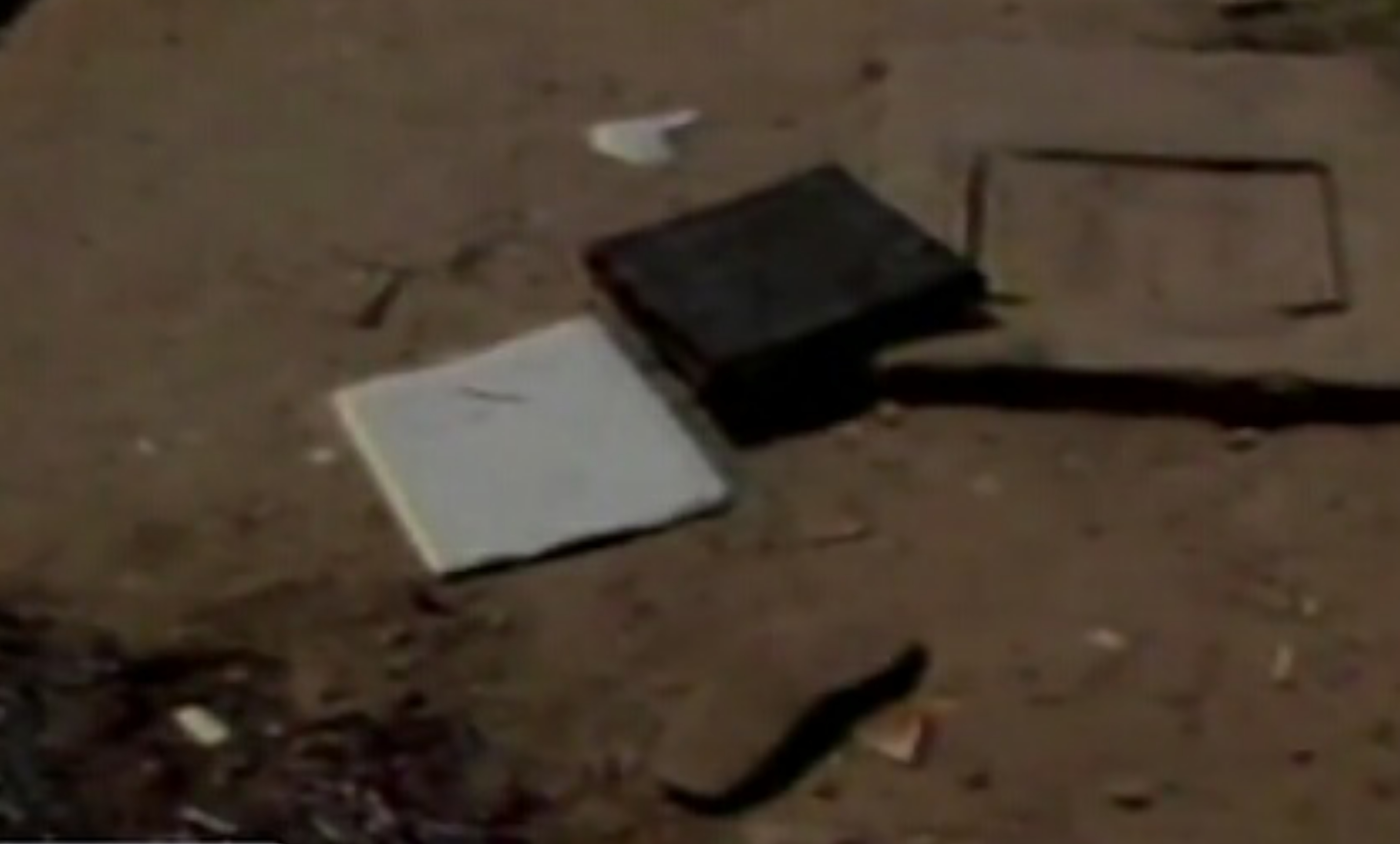
- blood spilt (left corner) over the place following the shooting
- Location: Polhengoda, Colombo
- Date: February 16, 1988; 38 years ago 12:20 p.m. (Sri Lanka Time)
- Target: Vijaya Kumaratunga (succeeded)
- Attack type: Political assassination; shooting
- Weapon: Type 56 assault rifle
- Deaths: Vijaya Kumaratunga (died February 16, 1988, at 12:22 p.m. from his injuries)
- Injuries: Sarath Upali (later died on April 25, 1988 at the Colombo General Hospital)
- Perpetrators: Lionel Ranasinghe alias Gamini; Tarzan Weerasinghe alias Herath
- Motive: Revenge for criticizing the Deshapremi Janatha Vyaparaya

Vijaya Kumaratunga, Sri Lankan politician and founder of the Sri Lanka Mahajana Pakshaya, was assassinated by an assassin of the militant organization Deshapremi Janatha Viyaparaya (DJV) on February 16, 1988, while attempting to leave his home in Polhengoda in Colombo.

Kumaratunga was the son-in-law of former prime ministers S. W. R. D. Bandaranaike and Sirimavo Bandaranaike, as well as the husband of future president Chandrika Kumaratunga, and with his funeral the Sri Lankan government declared an extended period of national mourning.

== Background ==
Kovilage Anton Vijaya Kumaranatunga was born on 9 October 1945 in Ja-Ela, Sri Lanka. In 1967, he started his film career and reached his peak with the romantic film Hanthane Kathawa directed by Sugathapala Senarath Yapa. Later he became a sensation among the public with several blockbuster movies, where he won the award for the Most Popular Actor from 1983 to 1988 in multiple events. At the time of his demise, he had acted in 122 films, eight of which were released posthumously.

Kumaratunga's cinema life would change once he entered politics with the Lanka Sama Samaja Party. In 1978, Kumaratunga married Chandrika Bandaranaike and later joined the Sri Lanka Freedom Party and became its first national organizer. After the 1982 presidential campaign of Hector Kobbekaduwa, Kumaratunga was accused of being a Naxalite and jailed under the emergency regulations of President J. R. Jayewardene, but was never charged. In 1986, Kumaratunga visited Jaffna, which was then under the control of the Tamil separatist group, the Liberation Tigers of Tamil Eelam (LTTE), and met with local Tamil civilians, as well as several LTTE youth leaders.

In 1965, Marxist–Leninist politician Rohana Wijeweera founded the Janatha Vimukthi Peramuna and initiated several revolutionary steps towards the government and civilians. In 1971, the JVP conducted a failed insurrection, and launched an open revolt against the government of Prime Minister Sirimavo Bandaranaike. Wijeweera and the other major leaders of the insurgency were sentenced to prison as a result and the JVP was banned as a political party. However, in 1977, Prime Minister J. R. Jayewardene released the arrested JVP leaders after Jayewardene's party, the UNP, won the 1977 general elections. On 15 December 1986, the JVP abducted and murdered Daya Pathirana, leader of the Independent Students' Union (ISU) of the University of Colombo. In 1987, the JVP attacked the Pallekele Army Camp in Kandy, and thus began the 1987–1989 JVP insurrection.

During this period, Kumaratunga was in support of the peace agreement signed between India and Sri Lanka and heavily criticized the armed rebellion led by the JVP. Kumaratunga was also a supporter of the provincial council system for Sri Lanka, as opposed to the JVP. However, although Kumaratunga's party supported the Indo-Sri Lanka Accord, the party was opposed to the presence of Indian troops in Sri Lanka. Kumaratunga's party also campaigned for lifting the ban on the JVP.

Nevertheless, due to his support of the Indo-Sri Lanka Accord, the Deshapremi Janatha Viyaparaya (the de facto military branch of the JVP) chose to take quick actions against Kumaratunga and eventually planned to assassinate Kumaratunga.The DJV was a vehemently anti-Indian organisation and was considered the de facto military branch of the JVP. On the day of Kumaratunga's funeral, the DJV issued a leaflet showing several reasons which "justified" his assassination, according to the DJV. The main reason was his support for the Indo-Sri Lanka Accord, the Indian Peace Keeping Force (IPKF) and the Provincial Councils that came in its wake. The DJV even accused Kumaratunga of being a CIA agent.

== Preparations ==
Prior to the assassination, Kumaratunga had received several death threats from the DJV. Ignoring these treats, Kumaratunga severely criticized its campaign of terror. The decision to assassinate Kumaratunga had been planned by Colombo District Secretary Lalith Wijeratne (alias Jayantha) since 1980. Search for information was handled by Piyasiri Kolonnawa. The discussions were held at the St. Mitchell Hotel in Piliyandala. Lionel Ranasinghe got the contract through Tarzan Weerasinghe. The gun used in the assassination was a firearm stolen from a bodyguard of then UNP government minister Gamini Lokuge.

The responsibility of assassinating Kumaratunga was given to Lionel Ranasinghe, alias Gamini. Before killing Kumaratunga, Gamini and his biker Tarzan spied around Kumaratunga's house for a few days. Gamini also rented a small boutique near Kumaratunga's house for the mission, which was taken by the DJV for their businesses. A cricketing bag which held the T-56 gun was kept at the residence of a witness identified as Dharmadasa.

== Assassination ==
On 16 February 1988, Gamini and Tarzan Weerasinghe decided to kill Kumaratunga. Kumaratunga participated in the Puttalam District Conference of the Sri Lanka Mahajana Party in Chilaw and returned home at around 11:30 AM. Kumaratunga was then seen talking to several people under a mango tree in front of his house at Kirulapone Thalakotuwa Estate. Gamini took his T56 weapon in one hand. The two of them approached the shop and waited for Kumaratunga to come out of his house. Gamini saw Kumaratunga exiting his house and speaking to someone in front of the house. Kumaratunga was near the gate when he was shot twice in back while Gamini sitting in the back seat of the motorcycle. After the gunshot, Kumaratunga fell to the ground and Gamini got off the motorcycle before shooting Kumaratunga once more in the head, thinking that the first two shots would not have killed Kumaratunga.

After the autopsy, Chief Judicial Medical Officer of the Colombo General Hospital, Dr. M. S. L. Salgado stated that Kumaratunga's death had occurred due to injuries to the neck and head. Police later found 14 empty shell casings from the scene of the crime. Sarath Upali, the Assistant Secretary of the Ragama Branch of the Sri Lanka Mahajana Pakshaya and painter was also shot and wounded at the time of the assassination. He later fell seriously ill and died on 25 April, 1988, at the Colombo General Hospital.

== Flight and capture of the conspirators ==
Dayaratne, Kumaratunga's driver, got into a double cab parked in the backyard with the intention of chasing the killers, but ultimately changed his mind after the assassins attempted to fire at him. Dayaratne ran into the house with Lalith, Kumaratunga's guard and got into the double cab with a firearm. The firearm was in Lalith's hand and Dayaratne drove the cab at high speeds. Dayaratne and Lalith saw the killers flee towards Kirulapone on Polhengoda Road, while the killers fled on a CD 200 motorcycle. Dayaratne and Lalith had just escaped from the Kirulapone cemetery as they chased the killers along Siebel Avenue on Polhengoda Road. The CD 200 Honda motorcycle numbered 90 Sri 4320 was found abandoned near the Kalubowila Hospital. Further investigations revealed that the motorcycle was hijacked on 18 January 1988 at Thimbiriya, Ihalagama, Nikaweratiya.

As such, the two diverted the cab to the Kirulapone Police Station. As soon as Lalith lodged a complaint with the Kirulapone Police, investigations into Kumaratunga's assassination was launched by a team led by Inspector Nandana Wijeratne, then the OIC of the CID. Inspector Wijeratne went to Kumaratunga's house in Polhengoda and began investigations with a police team. There were some witnesses who had not been aware of the assassin's plans when they accommodated his requests. After hearing the news of the shooting, the witnesses realized the intentions of the assassin, but they were frightened to inform the police.

After the shooting, Gamini took the file that Kumaratunga had and looked at what was in it. There were only some useless papers. Then he dropped the file and put the gun to the bag and flee with Tarzan. They went along Polhengoda Road and left the bicycle at the house where the bicycle was told to kept and left the bag with the gun in another house. There was a man called Paala in that house. Gamini gave the gun and a grenade to Paala. Gamini then took off the bloody t-shirt and asked for another t-shirt. Then Gamini and Tarzan came to Piliyandala Road from that house and got on the bus. They went to the Dayasan Tailor shop in Piliyandala and met Sarath there. At 4 pm they left Dayasan tailor shop and came to the house at Dampe. At 9 pm, their leader Asoka came and asked about the incident. The two were later secretly detained by the party at a poultry farm in Gorakapitiya under the inspection of Vijitha. After a while they get a call from the party to come to Maharagama. They then attacked the Ja-Ela Air Force Base and returned to the poultry farm.

Meanwhile, the biggest challenge for the police team was finding the killers' appearance. Police questioned Kumaratunga's driver, the security guard Lalith and several others around Kumaratunga at the time of the shooting about the killers' appearance. Based on the information obtained from them, a police team drew a sketch of the killer and for the first time in the history of the Sri Lanka Police, a sketch of an assassin was painted. The police also sent the sketch to the police stations in Colombo and surrounding areas in a bid to expedite the investigation. The sketch was studied by Crime Detective Bureau (CDB) sleuths on surveillance duty.

While investigations were being carried out on Kumaratunga's killer, Inspector Nandana Wijeratne had received information from one of his private spies. When the police team found him, arrested him and interrogated him, information about a person named Sajith was revealed. During the interrogation of Sajith, information about Gamini was revealed. All of them are strong activists of the Patriotic People's Movement.

When Gamini was arrested in connection with a number of robberies in the Horana Police Division, the police had taken a photograph of him and handed over a copy of the photograph to the National Intelligence Bureau. The photo of Gamini in the possession of the National Intelligence Bureau was similar to the photo painted by the police. Even then, Gamini was wanted in a number of murders. Following the assassination, the Patriotic People's Movement, claimed responsibility in a statement and distributed a pamphlet on 21 February 1988 entitled 'Why Vijaya Kumaratunga was sent?'.

== Conspirators' trial and execution ==
On March 14, 1989, CDB constables Basil and Dias spotted a person on Bullers Road, resembling the man in the sketch. The arrested Gamini was bundled into a trishaw, took him to the CDB Office. Minister Ranjan Wijeratne visited Gamini who was being held at a Slave Island Police cell more than 20 times during the period. He listened to his confessions and minister ordered SSP Gamini Perera to hand over Gamini to the CID. Therefore, within 24 hours of the arrest, Gamini was handed over to the CID and was taken to the fourth floor of the CID for interrogations under the direction of the then Director, SSP Chandra Jayawardena. On March 24, 1989, Gamini made a 179 pages long confession to the CID about Kumaratunga's assassination.

The CDB convinced that Gamini was a straight JVP killer who was the first trained assassin of JVP, trained by a former army sergeant in the Ratnapura jungles. He was later brought to the Homagama Police Station, was taken out in a Land Cruiser jeep on October 3, 1989, at 7 pm and later killed in a jungle area in Padukka at around 1 am the next morning. The body was put on the tires and burned.

On December 25, 1990, the security forces went to the house of Tarzan's friend Nimal Gunasinghe in Angulana, Moratuwa to capture Tarzan. But he was not there and was later arrested by CID near Angulana house. Tarzan was then placed on the fourth floor. He was shot dead three months later at Nugegoda junction.

== Aftermath ==
Kumaratunga's face was brutally shot and deformed. Makeup artist Ebert Wijesinghe portrayed Kumaratunga's body in a very close-knit manner, but his wife Chandrika believed that his face should not be shown to the people. As a result, the upper part of Kumaratunga's corpse was covered by the coffin as a last tribute.

After his death, Kumaratunga's body was brought from Narahenpita through the Town Hall in a large procession. A state funeral was held at the Independence Square with full live coverage on television on 21 February 1988. It was the first ever funeral in Sri Lanka to be telecast live on state television. Kumaratunga's wife Chandrika Kumaratunga fled the country with her two children, seeking self-imposed asylum in the United Kingdom. The day of Kumaratunga's assassination is often known as "Horrible Tuesday" or "the Darkest Tuesday in Sri Lankan History". His death is still mourned by many Sri Lankans.

The mastermind behind the assassination is still a mystery. Just after the funeral, Kumaratunga's wife Chandrika claimed that the assassination was the work of the CIA. Regardless, most people blame the JVP and the DJV for the assassination. According to the testimony of retired inspector U.A. Piyasena, then CID director SSP Bennet Perera, who was transferred out of the CID in February 1989, had advised Piyasena to lay off the assassination investigations for his own good. Piyasena also hinted that there were signals from ministers not to proceed.

== Presidential Commission of Inquiry ==
Later in 1995, after being elected president, Chandrika Kumaratunga alleged that J. R. Jayewardene regime was behind the assassination of her husband and suspected then Prime Minister Ranasinghe Premadasa, and Defense Minister Ranjan Wijeratne. She appointed a Presidential Commission of Inquiry into the assassination of Vijaya Kumaratunga on 16 February 1995. The Commissioners were Supreme Court Judges Padmanathan Ramanathan, Sarath Nanda Silva and High Court Judge Dharmasiri Jayawickrema. Upali de Silva was the Secretary of the Commission on Public Administration and its Assistant Secretary was Edward Geeganage.

The Commission commenced its hearing on April 14, 1995, and examined the evidence for eight months until December 15, 1995. A total of 72 witnesses testified before the Commission, which consisted of 15 volumes and 3,441 pages. The full report of the inquiry conducted by the Presidential Commission was submitted on 29 February 1996. After several investigations, the Presidential Commission report had concluded that President Premadasa, Gamini Lokuge and Deputy Minister of Defence Ranjan Wijeratne should be behind the assassination, but no prosecutions took place.

Subsequently, a case was filed against Assistant Superintendent of Police Chandra Wakishta and the then Director of the CID, Chandrasena Jayawardena. They were released on October 23, 2002, by Colombo Fort Magistrate Priyantha Fernando.

== Assassins ==
=== Lionel Ranasinghe ===
Palammullalage Lionel Ranasinghe was born in 1962 in Kuruwita, Ratnapura as the eldest of the family. He was also known as Gamini alias Mahinda alias Jayatilleke, a resident of the Moonagama National Housing Scheme on Ratnapura Road, Horana. Lionel's father Thegiris was born on April 19, 1930, in Palamure, Kegalle and ran a lime shop in front of the Kuruwita police station. Born in Delgamuwa, Lionel's mother Welikalage Sisilin Nona had five children. Lionel and his younger brother Sunil are the children of their mother's first marriage. Lionel is the eldest in the family. When Lionel was 2 years old, his father abandoned his mother and two children and remarried. From his second marriage, Lionel's father has two daughters and a son. Lionel's mother later married Leonoris Fernando of Horana and moved to Moonagama, Horana. Leonoris served in the Horana Municipal Council and was a staunch UNP supporter.

Lionel went to Kuruwita Maha Vidyalaya and passed the GCE Ordinary Level with four credit passes in seven subjects. He learned karate from Nanda Siriwardena and learned kung fu from Seewali teacher. Lionel entered the Horana College of Education and studied Commerce in A/Ls. Lionel and his brother Sunil went to sell peas near a liquor store in Horana, giving a boost to their livelihood and occasionally went to work for hire.

At the age of 16 while studying for A/L, he attended JVP political classes in 1978 under the guidance of Jayasiri, a senior student of the school. Lionel joined the JVP full time in 1981. On April 2, 1981, Lionel served as a Red Troop to receive Rohana Wijeweera at the Kalutara Town Hall. Afraid of Lionel's politics, his mother sent Lionel to a herd in Kekirawa. He worked as a farmer for only about a year and later worked as a security guard for a private security company. Lionel returned to Horana in 1984 and sold vegetables at the market on Thursdays and Fridays and peanuts on other days. He joined full time politics in 1986 through Batagoda Gamage Jayawardena.

Lionel and 5 others were arrested by the Horana Police on April 12, 1987, in a robbery to raise funds for the JVP. As they were being taken from prison for an identification parade, they attacked the jailors near the Bolgoda bridge and escaped with the support of the JVP from outside. Then he underwent a week of training at Bambarakanda, Badulla on December 13, 1986, a week of weapons training on April 12, 1987, at the Shandripada site and again on March 17, 1988, at the Kuruwita Shandripada site in Ratnapura. According to the strategic path of the rise of socialism through a national liberation struggle, Lionel killed more than 41 persons.

=== Tarzan Weerasinghe ===
Tarzan was born on January 13, 1958. He is a resident of Payagala, Kalutara. Tarzan's family consisted of nine siblings, four of whom were male. One of Tarzan's sisters, Weerasinghe Leelawathi Silva, was a teacher at a girls' school in Panadura. He worked for the Kalutara Associated Motorways for some time and later worked as a SLTB driver on the SLTB bus from Kalutara to Yatadola. He quit his job and joined the JVP full time. Tarzan was married to Padmini.

== See also ==
- List of people assassinated by the Janatha Vimukthi Peramuna
