= Chandrika Kumaratunga =

President of Sri Lanka from 1994 to 2005

- චන්ද්‍රිකා කුමාරතුංග சந்திரிகா குமாரதுங்க
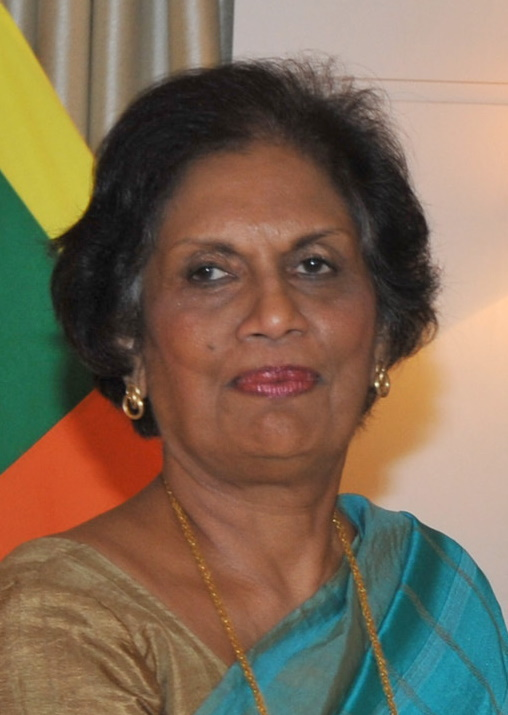
- Kumarathunga in 2015

5th President of Sri Lanka
- In office 12 November 1994 – 19 November 2005
- Prime Minister: Sirimavo Bandaranaike; Ratnasiri Wickremanayake; Ranil Wickremesinghe; Mahinda Rajapaksa
- Preceded by: Dingiri Banda Wijetunga
- Succeeded by: Mahinda Rajapaksa

14th Prime Minister of Sri Lanka
- In office 19 August 1994 – 12 November 1994
- President: Dingiri Banda Wijetunga
- Preceded by: Ranil Wickremesinghe
- Succeeded by: Sirimavo Bandaranaike

Chairperson of the Sri Lanka Freedom Party
- In office 19 August 1994 – 07 April 2006
- Preceded by: Sirimavo Bandaranaike
- Succeeded by: Mahinda Rajapaksa

Member of Parliament for Gampaha
- In office 19 August 1994 – 12 November 1994
- Majority: 464,588 Preferential Votes

2nd Chief Minister of the Western Province
- In office 21 May 1993 – 18 August 1994
- Governor: Suppiah Sharvananda; D. M. Swaminathan
- Preceded by: Susil Moonesinghe
- Succeeded by: Morris Rajapaksa

Personal details
- Born: Chandrika Dias Bandaranaike; 29 June 1945 (age 81) Colombo, British Ceylon
- Party: Sri Lanka Freedom Party
- Other political affiliations: People's Alliance (1994–2004); United People's Freedom Alliance (2004–2006)
- Spouse: Vijaya Kumaratunga (m. 1978; died 1988)
- Children: 2
- Parent(s): Solomon Bandaranaike (father); Sirimavo Ratwatte (mother)
- Education: Institut d'Études Politiques d'Aix-en-Provence; Institut d'Études Politiques de Paris

Chandrika Bandaranaike Kumaratunga (Sinhala: චන්ද්‍රිකා බණ්ඩාරනායක කුමාරතුංග; Tamil: சந்திரிகா பண்டாரநாயக்க குமாரதுங்க; née Bandaranaike; born 29 June 1945), commonly referred to by her initials CBK, is a Sri Lankan stateswoman who served as the fifth president of Sri Lanka from 1994 to 2005. She is the longest-serving president in Sri Lankan history. She led the Sri Lanka Freedom Party (SLFP) from 1994 to 2006.

Born in 1945 into a prominent Sri Lankan political family, she is the younger daughter of two former prime ministers, Solomon Bandaranaike and Sirimavo Bandaranaike. Kumaratunga entered politics in the 1970s, initially focusing on social welfare and rural development. After spending several years in exile following the assassination of her husband, Vijaya Kumaratunga, she returned to Sri Lanka in the late 1980s. In 1993, she was elected Chief Minister of the Western Province. The following year, after becoming the leader of the Sri Lanka Freedom Party, she formed the People's Alliance and led her coalition to victory in the 1994 parliamentary elections. In the presidential election held later that year, she was elected as the first female president of Sri Lanka, defeating UNP candidate Srima Dissanayake in the largest landslide victory in Sri Lankan history, securing almost 62% of the votes. In the 1999 election, Kumaratunga survived an assassination attempt during her re-election campaign and went on to win a second term, defeating UNP candidate and Leader of the Opposition, Ranil Wickremesinghe.

She was responsible for the modernisation of the SLFP and the broader Sri Lankan left under the banner of “capitalism with a human face.” This marked a decisive shift from the inward-looking, state-controlled economic policies of earlier SLFP administrations ran by her parents. Kumaratunga’s approach maintained a market-oriented economy while emphasising equity and social protection, contributing to improved economic performance and broadening the appeal of her party.

She also played a key role in restoring a degree of normalcy to public life following the turbulence of the late 1980s and early 1990s, a period marked by political violence, state repression, and widespread insecurity during and after the Ranasinghe Premadasa presidency. Her administration focused on re-establishing democratic norms and reducing extra-judicial violence to bring on greater political stability. During her presidency, Kumaratunga pursued peace negotiations with the Liberation Tigers of Tamil Eelam (LTTE) in an effort to resolve the country’s long-running civil war. After the collapse of peace negotiations, Kumaratunga launched a military campaign known as the “War for Peace” during the Eelam III phase of the Sri Lankan Civil War - one of the conflict’s most intense and brutal periods of fighting. As part of a broader strategy to simultaneously isolate the LTTE politically and financially while pursuing a military solution, she succeeded in securing the group’s international isolation: many major states formally designated the LTTE a terrorist organization, cutting off key sources of funding and delivering a significant blow to its global propaganda network.

Her administration also introduced a major package of constitutional reforms, the "2000 Constitution", aimed at abolishing the executive presidency and devolving power to the Tamil people. However, the proposed reforms were never implemented due to the withdrawal of support from the opposition. Her tenure was marred by criticism of her use of presidential powers and by allegations of corruption within her administration.

== Early life and family ==
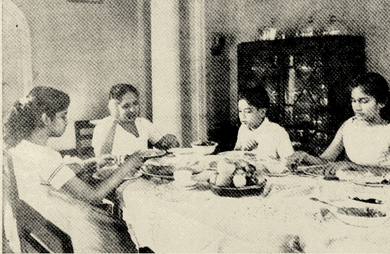
A young Chandrika Bandaranaike with her mother, sister Sunethra, and brother Anura.

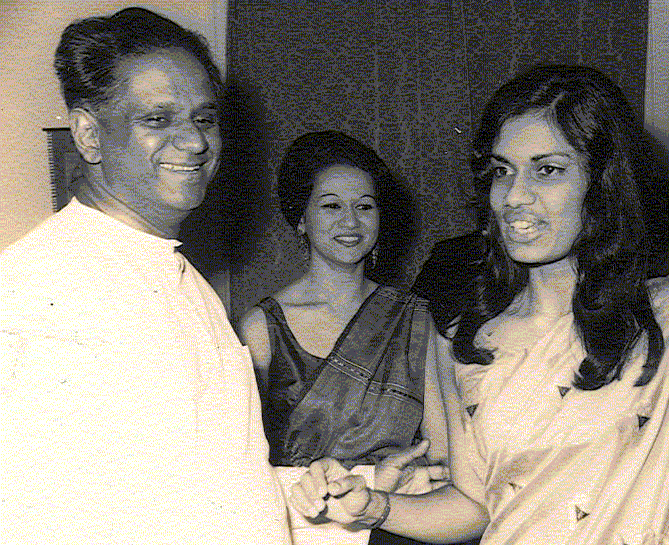
Chandrika with Sri Lankan diplomat Tissa Wijeyeratne in Paris, early 1970s

Chandrika Bandaranaike was born on 29 June 1945, at Wentworth in Guildford Crescent, Colombo to Solomon West Ridgeway Dias Bandaranaike and Sirima Ratwatte Dias Bandaranaike. The family moved the year later to a mansion at Rosmead Place, Colombo purchased by her paternal grandfather.

Her father S. W. R. D. Bandaranaike was an Oxford educated barrister who was the Minister of Local Administration at the time of her birth. A nationalist and left-wing politician, who had by the time built up a strong following known as the Sinhala Maha Sabha. He was the only son of Sir Solomon Dias Bandaranike, the Maha Mudaliyar, the chief Ceylonese representative and advisor to the Governor of Ceylon. Her mother Sirima Ratwatte Dias Bandaranaike was the daughter of Barnes Ratwatte Dissawa, Rate Mahatmaya of Balangoda during British colonial rule, who was descended from Ratwatte Dissawa, Dissawa of Matale, a signatory on behalf of the Sinhalese to the Kandyan Convention of 1815.

Kumaratunga was born into the prominent Bandaranaike family and spent her early years at their residence in Rosmead Place, Colombo, as well as at Horagolla Walauwa, her family's ancestral home. Her father, S. W. R. D. Bandaranaike, played a significant role in Sri Lanka’s early post-independence politics, serving as the country’s first Cabinet Minister of Health and Local Government in 1948. In 1951, he broke away from the governing party to establish the Sri Lanka Freedom Party (SLFP), shaping the political landscape of the country. Contesting the elections that followed and strengthening the SLFP in the periods between elections; Bandaranaike became the Leader of the Opposition in 1952 and prime minister in 1956. As prime minister, he was responsible for putting forth significant reforms such as the nationalization of bus companies and the Port of Colombo, a prohibition on caste-based discrimination, the removal of British military bases, and the establishment of diplomatic missions with a number of Communist states. He also made Sinhala the country's only official language, thus marginalizing the Tamils as well as members of the middle-class educated elite whose first language was English. He was subsequently assassinated in 1959 when Chandrika was fourteen. Following this in 1959, his widow, Sirimavo Bandaranaike, assumed leadership of the Sri Lanka Freedom Party (SLFP). In the 1960 general election, she led the party to victory, becoming the world's first female prime minister. Therefore, Chandrika was involved in politics from a young age along with her siblings as she was the second of three children in the family. Her elder sister Sunethra Bandaranaike became a socialite and her younger brother Anura Bandaranaike joined active politics, going on to become a cabinet minister and Speaker of the Parliament of Sri Lanka as well as the youngest leader of the opposition.

== Education ==
Chandrika was educated at the St Bridget's Convent, Colombo, and enrolled at the Roman Catholic Aquinas University College, Colombo to study for a law degree. However, in 1967, she left Aquinas for France without completing her law studies, on a scholarship from the Institute of French Studies. There she spent one year at the Institut d'études politiques d'Aix-en-Provence following a course in the French language and culture. In 1968, she went on to study at the Institut d'Etudes Politiques de Paris (Sciences Po) graduating with a diploma in political science in 1970. She thereafter enrolled in a PhD program in development economics at the École Pratique des Hautes Études, Paris, where she studied from 1970 to 1973. She is fluent in Sinhala, English and French.

== Early political career ==
She returned to Ceylon in 1972, where her mother had become prime minister for the second time in 1970 and launched a wide-ranging programme of socialist reform, and faced a violent communist insurrection in 1971. After returning she enrolled in and became active in the SLFP which had been founded by her father and now led by her mother. In 1974, she became an executive committee member of its Women's League.

She was appointed as an Additional Principal Director in the Land Reforms Commission (LRC) which acquired nearly 228,000 hectares of private land to the state under the Land Reform Law, which imposed a ceiling of twenty hectares on privately owned land. Leaving the LRC in 1976, she became the chairman of the Janawasa Commission, which established collective farms from land acquired by the LRC. Following the defeat of her mother's SLFP government in the 1977 general election, she left government service and acted as a consultant to the Food and Agriculture Organization of the United Nations till 1979.

=== Sri Lanka Mahajana Pakshaya (1984-88) ===
In 1978, she married Vijaya Kumaratunga a leading actor, and LSSP turned SLFP political activist. She supported his election campaign in the by-election in Mahara in 1983, where he lost in the recount. She left the SLFP in 1984 when Vijaya Kumaratunga formed his own party the Sri Lanka Mahajana Pakshaya (SLMP) supporting his political activities against the policies of the mainstream parties. She served as the vice president of the SLMP. This resulted in her falling out with her mother and brother who were leading the SLFP at the time. On 16 February 1988, Vijaya Kumaratunga was assassinated in front of his home in Narahenpita by gunmen in the presence of his wife. Chandrika Kumaratunga briefly took over the leadership of her husband's party, and formed the United Socialist Alliance with the Communist Party of Sri Lanka, the Lanka Sama Samaja Party, and the Nava Sama Samaja Party. Although it was well organized, it lacked votes. Fearing for her life, she soon fled the country in 1988, seeking refuge in the United Kingdom. There she worked for World Institute for Development Economics Research at the United Nations University.

=== Return to politics and leading the opposition (1991-94) ===
Following the end of the second JVP insurrection, Chandrika began visiting Sri Lanka in 1990 and re-engaging politics. In September 1991, the governing United National Party which had been dominating the political landscape was weakened when Lalith Athulathmudali and Gamini Dissanayake left the UNP and formed the Democratic United National Front following a failed impeachment against President Ranasinghe Premadasa. DUNF soon mobilized the opposition against the Premadasa government.

Following her return to Sri Lanka in 1991, Kumaratunga re-entered the SLFP, which was then led by her mother, Sirimavo Bandaranaike. She subsequently became a central figure in the formation of the People's Alliance (PA), a political coalition established in 1993 comprising the SLFP and several left-wing parties. The alliance sought to unite opposition forces against the UNP, which had been in power since 1977.

==== 1993 Provincial Council Elections & Anura's Defection to UNP ====
In the provincial council elections held on 17 May 1993, the PA led by Kumaratunga and its allies including the DUNF, won control of three provinces: Western, Southern and North Western, ending the UNP's control of these provincial administrations. Importantly, the PA emerged as the largest political group in the Western Province, winning 45 of the 104 seats, compared with 41 for the UNP. With the support of other opposition members, Kumaratunga assumed office as Chief Minister of the Western Province in June 1993.

Her elevation to the chief ministership also intensified the political rivalry within the Bandaranaike family, particularly with her brother, Anura Bandaranaike, who had previously served as Leader of the Opposition and was then a prominent figure in the SLFP. Anura opposed his sister's growing prominence within the party, amid indications that their mother, Sirimavo Bandaranaike, favoured Chandrika as her political successor. Following his suspension from the SLFP, Anura resigned from the party and crossed over to the governing UNP in October 1993. The UNP subsequently facilitated his return to Parliament by arranging the resignation of one of its National List members, whose seat he assumed. In January 1994, he was appointed Minister of Higher Education and National Reconciliation in President D. B. Wijetunga's government. Following Anura's departure, Kumaratunga was all but confirmed as her mother's political successor and the leading figure of the party's next generation.

==== 1994 Southern Provincial Council Election ====
In the May 1993 Southern Provincial Council election, the UNP secured 27 seats, while the People's United Front, led by the SLFP, won 22 seats and the Democratic United National Front secured six. Although the UNP emerged as the largest single party, the opposition parties collectively commanded a majority. The UNP initially sought to retain control of the Southern and North Western provincial administrations by having its nominees appointed as chief ministers. These appointments were challenged in court, which ruled that the governors had acted unlawfully by appointing individuals who did not command majority support in their respective councils. In December 1993, the Southern Provincial Council was dissolved following the defeat of its 1994 budget. The crisis followed the reported abduction of opposition councilor Wimal Francisco of Hambantota, whose absence prevented the opposition from securing the necessary votes to pass the budget. The People's Alliance opted to contest a fresh election rather than pursue a legal challenge to the dissolution.

Following his defection, Anura Bandaranaike campaigned heavily for the UNP in the election, undertaking to lead its campaign in the Galle District. He also predicted that as many as 40 additional SLFP parliamentarians would defect to the UNP. In January 1994, Gamini Dissanayake and several of his associates also left the Democratic United National Front (DUNF) and rejoined the UNP. The DUNF had been an ally of the SLFP-led opposition, and Dissanayake's departure represented a setback for the People's Alliance ahead of the forthcoming elections. Despite these developments, the PA led by Kumaratunga won the Southern Provincial Council election on 24 March 1994, securing 32 of the 55 seats. The victory further consolidated the PA's electoral position and demonstrated the growing strength of the opposition led by Kumaratunga as a credible alternative to the seemingly unshakeable UNP which had been in power for more than 16 years, ahead of the elections scheduled for later that year.

== Prime Minister (1994) ==
With President Wijetunga calling for general elections in 1994, she became the de facto leader of the SLFP and headed their national campaign against the UNP.

During the provincial council election campaigns of 1993 and 1994, Kumaratunga had sought to reassure voters and the business community that a People's Alliance government would maintain the market-oriented economic framework introduced by the UNP in 1977. This position became a prominent feature of the PA's campaign for the 1994 parliamentary election. Although the SLFP had traditionally advocated socialist economic policies, Kumaratunga pledged that a change of government would not entail a return to the state-centred economic policies of previous SLFP administrations. Instead, she advocated what she described as "capitalism with a human face", committing to retain the free-market system while placing greater emphasis on social welfare, poverty alleviation and the distribution of economic benefits. The position reflected her efforts to broaden the PA's appeal beyond its traditional left-wing constituency and reassure the private sector that the change of government would not reverse the economic liberalisation undertaken since 1977.

On the ethnic conflict, she also pledged to initiate unconditional negotiations with all Tamil political parties including the LTTE as part of an effort to reach a political settlement and address the grievances of Tamil people, as opposed to the UNP which maintained that the country was going through a purely terrorist issue, not an ethnic one.

The PA won 105 of the 225 seats in the parliamentary election held on 16 August 1994, compared with 94 seats for the United National Party, ending the UNP's 17-year period in government. Although the PA fell short of an absolute majority, it secured the parliamentary support necessary to form a government through an agreement with the Sri Lanka Muslim Congress, which held seven seats, and the support of an independent member, P. Chandrasekaran of the Up-Country People's Front. The result marked the first national electoral defeat of the UNP since 1977 and brought the PA to power under Kumaratunga's leadership She also succeeded her mother as the leader of the SLFP. Soon thereafter presidential elections were called for in November.

== Presidency (1994–2005) ==
=== Presidential Election - 1994 ===
Prime Minister Kumaratunga backed by the PA contested against Gamini Dissanayake, who was the leader of the opposition backed by the UNP. However, Dissanayake was soon assassinated by a LTTE suicide bomber and his widow Srima Dissanayake took over his nomination. Chandrika won the presidential election in 1994 gaining 62.28% of the vote. Becoming the first female president of Sri Lanka in November 1994, she appointed her mother to succeed her as prime minister.

=== Institutional Reform, Governance and Anti-corruption ===
==== Draft Constitution of 2000 ====
Kumaratunga's government pursued constitutional reform from 1995 as part of its efforts to resolve the civil war through the devolution of political power. Initial proposals, commonly known as the Devolution Proposals or Peace Package, were presented in August 1995 and subsequently revised through a parliamentary select committee. A further draft was submitted to Parliament in October 1997. In August 2000, Kumaratunga's government introduced the Constitution of the Republic of Sri Lanka Bill 2000. The proposal envisaged replacing the executive presidency with a parliamentary system of government, strengthening fundamental rights and establishing a framework for greater regional autonomy. It provided for regional councils with extensive powers over areas including land, law and order, and regional finances, while retaining a united Sri Lankan state.

The proposed constitution faced strong public opposition from the Buddhist clergy, Sinhala nationalist groups and the main opposition United National Party (UNP). Buddhist monks and nationalist demonstrators protested against the proposals, arguing that the devolution of power threatened the country's territorial integrity and the constitutional position of Buddhism. The parliamentary opposition was equally confrontational: when Kumaratunga presented the draft to Parliament on 3 August 2000, UNP members tore up and burned copies of the document inside the chamber, while party leader Ranil Wickremesinghe walked out. The UNP subsequently withheld its support, leaving the government without the two-thirds parliamentary majority required for constitutional reform.

The proposals were also rejected by the Liberation Tigers of Tamil Eelam (LTTE) and other Tamil groups as insufficient. According to The Washington Post, they maintained that Tamils should first be permitted to establish an independent state, after which they might consider a loose confederation with the rest of Sri Lanka.

==== Institutional Reform ====
Her government also introduced institutional reforms aimed at strengthening accountability and addressing corruption. In 1994, the government enacted the Commission to Investigate Allegations of Bribery or Corruption Act, establishing the Commission to Investigate Allegations of Bribery or Corruption (CIABOC) as an independent statutory body to investigate allegations of bribery and corruption. The commission commenced operations in December 1994, replacing the former Bribery Commissioner.

In 1996, the Kumaratunga government established the legal framework for the Human Rights Commission of Sri Lanka (HRCSL) through the Human Rights Commission of Sri Lanka Act, No. 21 of 1996. The legislation was enacted during the civil conflict and established a permanent statutory body with responsibility for investigating alleged violations of fundamental rights, monitoring the treatment of persons in detention and promoting compliance with constitutional and international human rights standards. The Commission was constituted in March 1997 and assumed responsibilities previously carried out by the Human Rights Task Force.

In December 1996, her government appointed a Presidential Task Force on Child Protection chaired by Adviser to the President Dr. Tara de Mel and Pediatrician Dr. Harendra de Silva, to examine measures to strengthen the protection of children from abuse and exploitation. The Task Force recommended a number of legal and administrative reforms, including the establishment of a dedicated national institution for child protection. Its recommendations contributed to the enactment of the National Child Protection Authority Act No. 50 of 1998, which established the National Child Protection Authority (NCPA). The Authority commenced operations in June 1999.

In 1996, the government amended the Telecommunications Act of 1991 through the Sri Lanka Telecommunications (Amendment) Act, No. 27 of 1996, strengthening the autonomy of the telecommunications regulator and establishing the Telecommunications Regulatory Commission of Sri Lanka (TRCSL) as an independent regulatory authority.

=== Economic policy ===
==== Economic philosophy and reform ====
During her presidency from 1994 to 2005, she modernized the Sri Lanka Freedom Party and the broader Sri Lankan left by advocating a philosophy termed “capitalism with a human face.” This represented a decisive departure from the earlier inward-looking, state-controlled economic policies associated with previous SLFP administrations, especially those under her mother, Sirimavo Bandaranaike, policies which had led to economic stagnation, low investment, and widespread shortages. Her leadership also helped broaden the political appeal of the SLFP by shifting its traditional socialist stance toward a centrist, third way philosophy that sought to combine free-market mechanisms with social democratic principles.

Kumaratunga appointed several prominent private-sector figures to key positions in economic policymaking and public-sector reform. Rajan Asirwatham, a senior partner at KPMG, became the first chairman of the Public Enterprises Reform Commission (PERC), established in 1996 to oversee reforms of state-owned enterprises. Investment banker Thilan Wijesinghe was appointed chairman and director general of the Board of Investment (BOI) in September 1995, where he promoted foreign investment and private-sector participation in infrastructure development. Michael Mack, chairman of Aitken Spence, also served at the BOI.

==== Public-sector reform, privatisation & public-private partnerships ====
Under these circumstances, the South Asia Gateway Terminals (SAGT) project was developed as a major public-private partnership (PPP) intended to introduce competition to container handling at the Port of Colombo, where operations had been dominated by the Sri Lanka Ports Authority (SLPA). Thilan Wijesinghe played a key role in advancing the project. It faced opposition from the minister in charge of the subject and resistance from within the SLPA, including attempts to halt its construction. Kumaratunga intervened decisively in support of Wijesinghe and the project, allowing construction to proceed despite the opposition. The partnership brought together John Keells Holdings, other local and international investors, and the SLPA under a 30-year build-operate-transfer concession. SAGT commenced operations in 1999, marking a significant development in private-sector participation in Sri Lanka's port infrastructure and the introduction of competition in container terminal operations.

The government also liberalised the fixed-line telecommunications sector by issuing licences to Lanka Bell and Suntel in 1996, introducing private-sector competition to the state-owned Sri Lanka Telecom. In 1997, the government sold a 35% stake in Sri Lanka Telecom to Japan's Nippon Telegraph and Telephone, which also assumed management control.

Kumaratunga's government sought to attract foreign direct investment (FDI) amid the ongoing civil war and the instability that had marked the final years of the Premadasa administration, when the JVP insurrection and widespread political violence deterred investment in Sri Lanka. In 1997, net FDI inflows reached 2.85% of GDP, the highest share in Sri Lanka's history.

She privatized several state corporations such as Sri Lanka Insurance Corporation, State Distilleries Corporation, Air Lanka among others.

==== Industrial development and exports ====
The government sought to expand industrial activity beyond major urban centres by promoting rural industries, export-oriented agro-processing and greater domestic value addition. It also encouraged diversification in manufactured products and export markets.

Accordingly, her administration oversaw a substantial expansion of the Board of Investment's network of export processing zones (EPZs) and industrial parks, from four in 1995 to twelve by 2001. The expansion included the establishment of new zones at Mirigama and Malwatta in 1997, followed by further developments at Wathupitiwala, Seethawaka, Mirijjawila, Mawathagama, Polgahawela and Horana.

Between 1994 and 2004, merchandise exports more than doubled from approximately US$2.24 billion to US$5.76 billion. In 2000, exports of goods and services reached 39.02% of GDP, the highest share recorded in Sri Lanka's history.

==== Economic performance ====
Between 1994 and 2004, Sri Lanka's gross domestic product (GDP), measured in current US dollars, almost doubled, increasing from approximately US$11.7 billion to US$20.1 billion, while per capita income also increased substantially, from US$652 to US$1,031. Over the same period, the labour force grew from approximately 6.08 million to 8.06 million, while the number of employed people increased from 5.28 million to 7.39 million. Unemployment also declined during her presidency, falling from approximately 13.1% in 1994 to 8.3% in 2004.

Kumaratunga's economic record has been favourably assessed for maintaining a stable economic growth rate of approximately 5% annually and keeping inflation in single digits, at around 8.5%, during her presidency, which coincided with some of the most intense fighting of the Civil War. Her administration oversaw economic recoveries following two major crisis during her presidency. After the economy contracted in 2001 for the first time since independence, amid a severe drought, the LTTE's attack on Bandaranaike International Airport which was the only international airport in the island and a global economic slowdown, GDP rebounded by 4% in 2002. Similarly, following the devastation caused by the December 2004 Indian Ocean tsunami, the economy recorded growth of approximately 6% in 2005.

Under Kumaratunga, Sri Lanka experienced its longest period without having to seek an active lending programme with the International Monetary Fund (IMF) since its first in 1965, with no programme in place between the expiration of the previous arrangement in July 1995 and the approval of a new arrangement in April 2001.

Despite these developments, imports increased from US$3.32 billion in 1994 to US$8.00 billion in 2004, widening the trade deficit. Over the same period, the Sri Lankan rupee depreciated against the US dollar, with the annual average exchange rate rising from approximately LKR 49 per dollar in 1994 to LKR 101 in 2004.

=== Media and Free Expression ===
Her administration undertook significant reforms to liberalize Sri Lanka's media environment and increase the plurality of privately owned broadcasting. Private television networks were permitted to produce and broadcast their own domestic news, ending the previous state monopoly over television news. The government also expanded private broadcasting through the issue of additional radio and television licenses. In June 1997, following the appointment of Mangala Samaraweera as Minister of Posts, Telecommunications and Media, the government approved 13 new radio and television licenses.

The administration also pursued reforms affecting the newspaper sector. A committee established in 1995 examined the broadening of ownership of Associated Newspapers of Ceylon Limited (ANCL), the state-controlled Lake House group, with the stated objective of strengthening media freedom and media pluralism. The proposal sought to distribute ownership more widely, including among journalists and employees, but was not implemented. The government also repealed the Parliamentary Powers and Privileges Act in 1997, removing a legal provision that had permitted Parliament to impose imprisonment or fines for alleged insults to members of Parliament.

The period also saw continued growth and diversification of the privately owned press. Newspapers established before her presidency, including Lankadeepa, The Island and Sunday Times, continued to operate alongside publications established during her tenure, including the Sunday Leader in 1994, Mid-Week Mirror and Weekend Express in 1995, and Daily Mirror in 1999. By the end of her presidency, Sri Lanka had a variety of independent, privately owned newspapers, journals, radio stations and television stations, most of which freely criticised the government and its policies. The government imposed no political restrictions on the establishment of new media enterprises, although it continued to control the country's largest newspaper chain, two major television stations and the Sri Lanka Broadcasting Corporation.

Her administration also imposed strict temporary censorship and restrictions on reporting concerning military and security operations during the civil war, particularly from 1995 onwards, with such measures varying in scope and intensity over the course of the conflict.

=== Civil War ===
Early in her term, she made conciliatory moves toward the separatist Tamil Tigers (LTTE) in an attempt to end the ongoing civil war.

==== Sudu Nelum Movement ====
The People's Alliance government led by Kumaratunga launched the Sudu Nelum Movement, an extensive national public awareness campaign aimed at preparing the public for a peaceful settlement of the ethnic conflict. Named after the “White Lotus,” symbolizing purity, peace, and unity and spearheaded by the then Minister of Telecommunications and Media Mangala Samaraweera, the objective of the SNM was to bridge the gap between the Sinhala and Tamil communities and to create awareness amongst the public of the necessity for power sharing. The Movement organized youth camps across the island and notably held a highly successful camp for Jaffna youth in the south. By mid-1998, the SNM had established 146 branches nationwide (including in Jaffna) and two international branches in Japan, launching its second awareness phase through the “Caravan” (Thawalama): a traveling series of street performances, theatre, exhibitions, and video presentations designed to foster inter-communal understanding. Another major undertaking was the reconstruction of the Jaffna Public Library, destroyed in the 1981 anti-Tamil pogrom.

However, the peace talks and negotiations initiatied by the Kumaratunga administration unfolded as the LTTE resumed its violent campaign after violating the cease-fire and sinking two Sri Lanka Navy gunboats known as SLNS Sooraya and SLNS Ranasuru on 19 April 1995.

==== War for Peace ====
After the LTTE sabotaged the peace talks, She pursued a military-based strategy against them, dubbed 'War for Peace'. This began what was arguably the most brutal phase of the Civil War, Eelam War III. The Kumaratunga Administration launched several major offensives such as Operation Riviresa (1995) which captured the Jaffna Peninsula from the LTTE, Operation Sath Jaya (1996) which recaptured Mullaitivu and Operation Rana Gosa (1999).

However, the armed forces suffered major set backs at to the Battle of Mullaitivu in 1996 and Battle of Kilinochchi in 1998. Her government thereafter launched Operation Jayasikurui which soon bogged down with heavy casualties.

==== Wartime Censorship ====
During the civil war, the Kumaratunga administration introduced a series of censorship measures concerning military and security operations. From 1995 onwards, the government periodically restricted the publication and broadcasting of information relating to military operations and limited journalists' access to conflict areas. In June 1998, the government imposed direct censorship on domestic and foreign media reports concerning ongoing or possible future military and security operations. The censorship order was reissued in November 1999 following military setbacks.

In May 2000, following major advances by the LTTE, new Emergency Regulations further tightened the censorship regime, giving the government powers to impound printing presses and close newspapers or broadcasting stations considered threats to national security. The government subsequently established a Media Information Centre to approve print and broadcast material produced in Sri Lanka, including material prepared by foreign journalists. In late May, two publications in Colombo and an independent newspaper in Jaffna were closed under the new regulations on security grounds. The Supreme Court declared the censorship regulations invalid in June and ordered the newspapers to reopen, after which the government reissued regulations in a form consistent with the court's ruling.

The restrictions were accompanied by pressure on individual journalists and media organisations. Several journalists reported threats or intimidation, while the government pursued defamation cases against editors of newspapers critical of the government or supportive of the opposition.

=== Foreign policy ===
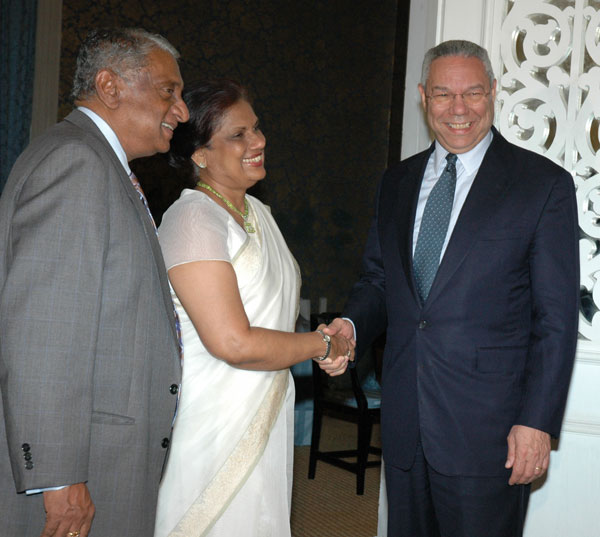
Kumaratunga (center) meeting with former U.S. Secretary of State Colin Powell (right)

Her government, led by Foreign Minister Lakshman Kadirgamar increased the recognition and acceptance of Sri Lanka on the international stage, which had been greatly affected by the riots and suppression of insurgency in the 1980s. She succeeded in having the LTTE banned internationally; with the United States and the United Kingdom proscribed the LTTE on 8 October 1997 and 28 February 2001 respectively, thereby depriving that organization of a primary source of funding. Her government re-established formal diplomatic ties with Israel in 2000, which had become a major supplier of weapons to the island.

==== Presidential Election - 1999 ====
In October 1999, Kumaratunga called an early presidential election. She lost vision in her right eye (permanent optic nerve damage) in an assassination attempt, by the Tamil Tigers, at her final election rally at Colombo Town Hall premises on 18 December 1999. She managed to defeat Ranil Wickremasinghe in the election held on 21 December and was sworn in for another term the next day.

Her second term saw the civil war aggravating with her government suffering major defeats against the LTTE such as the Second Battle of Elephant Pass and Bandaranaike Airport attack.

UNP Government 2001–2004

In December 2001, her party the People's Alliance lost the parliamentary election to the UNP, and her political opponent, Ranil Wickremasinghe, became Sri Lanka's new prime minister. She continued as president of Sri Lanka although her relationship with the Wickremasinghe government was a strained one.

In February 2002 Wickremasinghe's government and the LTTE signed a permanent ceasefire agreement, paving the way for talks to end the long-running conflict. In December, the government and the rebels agreed to share power during peace talks in Norway. President Kumaratunga believed Wickremasinghe was being too lenient towards the LTTE, and in May 2003 she indicated her willingness to sack the prime minister and government if she felt they were making too many concessions to the rebels. On 4 November 2003, while Prime Minister Wickremasinghe was on an official visit to the US, Kumaratunga prorogued Parliament and took over Defense, Interior, and Media ministries herself. Her opponents criticized her, calling her behavior dictatorial.

UPFA Government 2004–2005

Kumaratunga's PA and the leftist Janatha Vimukthi Peramuna (JVP) formed the United People's Freedom Alliance (UPFA) in January 2004 and dissolved Parliament. Having won the election held on 2 April 2004, the UPFA formed a government with Mahinda Rajapaksa as prime minister. This marked the first time in history that the JVP became part of a ruling coalition in the Sri Lankan government. In June 2005, the JVP defected from Kumaratunga's government over a disagreement regarding a joint mechanism with LTTE rebels sharing foreign aid to rebuild the tsunami-devastated Northern and Eastern areas of Sri Lanka.

Kumaratunga's six-year term ended that year in 2005. She argued that since the 1999 election had been held one year early, she should be allowed to serve that leftover year stating that she had a secret swearing-in for her second term a year after her formal swearing-in. The Supreme Court rejected this stating that her term ended in 2005.

In the presidential elections that followed, Mahinda Rajapaksa was elected with 50.29% of the vote and succeeded Kumaratunga as president, leading all 25 parties in the UPFA. Kumaratunga was listed 25th by Forbes magazine in its "100 most powerful women" in 2005.

== Post-presidency ==
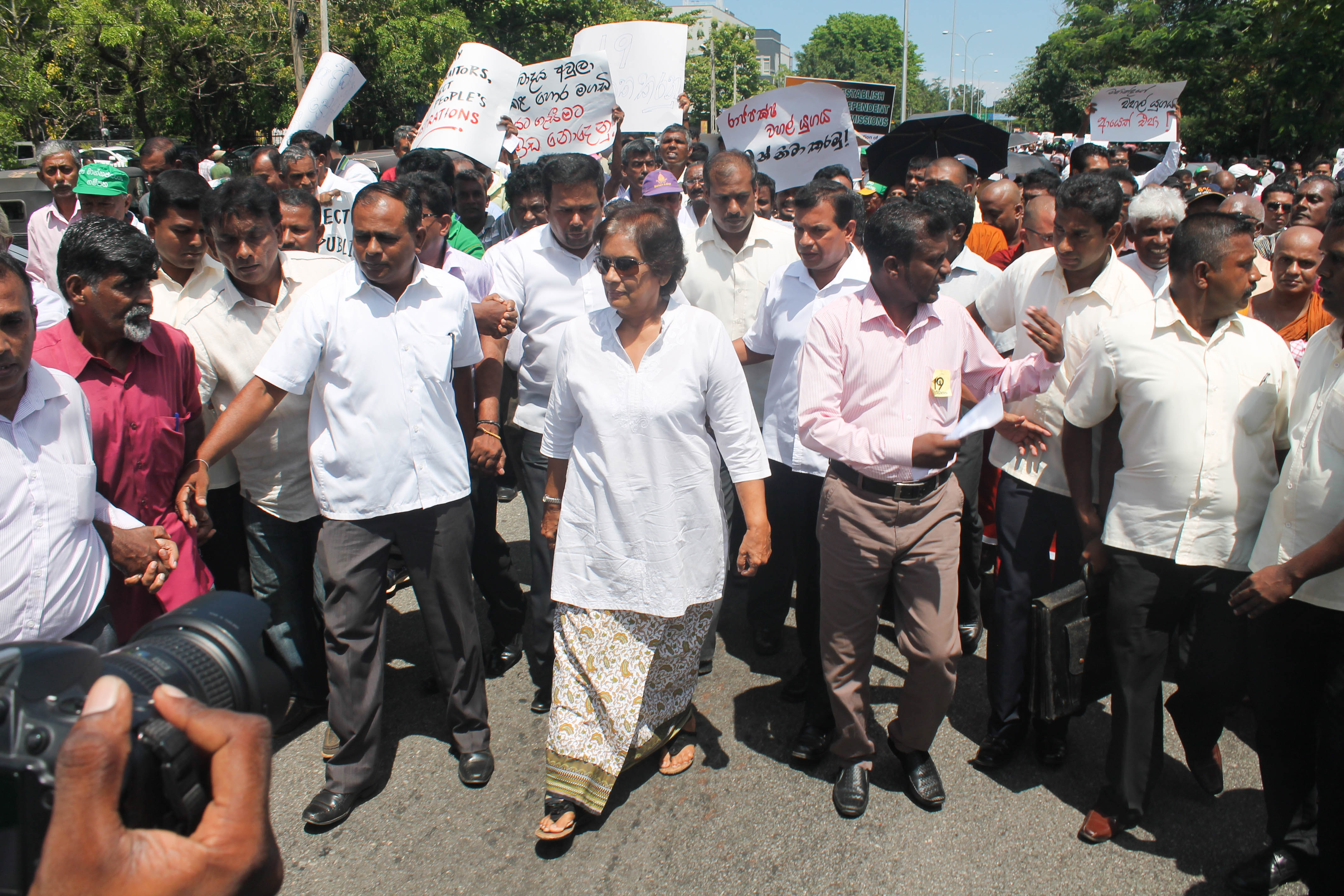
Participating in a protest in support of the Nineteenth Amendment in Colombo, Sri Lanka, in 2015

In 2006, having remained the leader of the SLFP after leaving office, she "temporally" stepped down from the party leadership citing "continuous harassment she has faced after Mahinda Rajapaksa took office as president" and soon after left the country for self-imposed exile in the United Kingdom.

Kumaratunga is a member of the Council of Women World Leaders and the Global Leadership Foundation. In November 2009, Kumaratunga was appointed to the 12-member board of directors of the Club de Madrid. She is a frequent panelist and member of the Clinton Global Initiative and advisor to its annual meeting held every September.

Kumaratunga noted in 2007: "I sincerely tried to reach a political consensus to solve the ethnic question, and tried to introduce a pluralistic constitution that would cater to the political aspirations of the Tamil people without dividing the country.″ In September 2009, Kumaratunga, on a personal visit to Kerala, India told reporters: "I too care for my life. Even though the current government is a government of my party I don't feel safe." She continued, "There is an overall lack of freedom and an atmosphere of fear prevails in the country. The basic rights of the people and media freedom are restricted in Sri Lanka." In February 2017, Kumaratunga accepted an invitation to join the eminent international Council of Patrons of the Asian University for Women (AUW) in Chittagong, Bangladesh.

=== 2015 Sri Lankan presidential election ===
On 21 November 2014 Kumaratunga formally announced her return to active politics at a press conference held by the country's opposition coalition, following weeks of speculation regarding her involvement in the coalition's decision-making. She successfully endorsed Maithripala Sirisena as the common candidate of the opposition in the 2015 presidential election, who defeated Mahinda Rajapaksa. In the same year, Kumaratunga supported the United National Party in the general elections to avoid Rajapaksa becoming prime minister. In 2015 she was appointed as the chairperson of office for national unity and reconciliation to overlook national unity in Sri Lanka.

=== 2018 Maldivian presidential election ===
In the aftermath of the 2018 Maldivian presidential election, it was revealed that Kumaratunga was instrumental in forming the opposition alliance against incumbent President Abdulla Yameen. Kumaratunga coordinated with opposition leaders in both the Maldives and Sri Lanka, bridging trust between the disputing opposition parties to form a coalition.

=== 2018 Sri Lankan constitutional crisis ===
During the 2018 Sri Lankan constitutional crisis, Kumaratunga remained silent and later claimed she was not invited to the special convention of the SLFP on 4 December 2018.

=== 2019 Sri Lankan presidential election ===
Kumaratunga endorsed Sajith Premadasa in the 2019 Sri Lankan presidential election.

Following the election, Chandrika Bandaranaike Kumaratunga largely withdrew from active politics but remained vocal on national issues. She resigned as Chairperson of the Office for National Unity and Reconciliation (ONUR) in November 2019, shortly after receiving the 2019 Common Ground Award for her contribution to peace and reconciliation.

In January 2020, the Sri Lanka Freedom Party (SLFP) removed her from the post of Attanagalla organiser for supporting Premadasa in the 2019 election, contrary to the party’s stance. In April 2024, she filed legal action against former President Maithripala Sirisena, seeking to prevent him from acting as SLFP chairman.

Kumaratunga has continued to comment publicly on political and economic matters and has voiced concerns regarding her personal security and entitlements as a former president. In 2025, following the repeal of ex-presidential privileges, she announced plans to vacate her official residence while recovering from hip surgery.

== Public service and philanthropy ==
After leaving office, Kumaratunga has remained active in public service through a range of philanthropic, educational, and civic initiatives.

In 2010, she established the South Asian Policy and Research Institute (SAPRI), a non-profit, non-partisan think tank focused on peace, good governance, economic development, poverty alleviation and regional cooperation in South Asia.

In 2023, while serving as the Chairperson of the Bandaranake Center for International Studies (BCIS), she established the Bandaranaike Academy for Leadership and Public Policy (BALPP), Sri Lanka's first institute specializing in leadership and public policy education.

Following Cyclone Ditwah, the Bandaranaike National Memorial Foundation (BNMF), chaired by Kumaratunga, donated Rs. 250 million to the government's national disaster-recovery fund to support relief, resettlement and reconstruction in affected communities.

== Electoral history ==
Provincial Election
Year	Constituency	Position	Party	Alliance	Votes	Result
1993	Western Province	Chief Minister	Sri Lanka Freedom Party	People's Alliance	307,471	Elected

Parliamentary Election
Year	Constituency	Position	Party	Alliance	Votes	%	Result
1994	Gampaha District	Member of Parliament	Sri Lanka Freedom Party	People's Alliance	464,588	91.27%	Elected

Presidential Elections
Year	Constituency	Position	Party	Alliance	Votes	%	±	Result
1994	Sri Lanka	President	Sri Lanka Freedom Party	People's Alliance	4,709,205	62.28%	62.28	Won
1999	Sri Lanka	President	Sri Lanka Freedom Party	People's Alliance	4,312,157	51.12%	▼11.16	Won

== Personal life ==
Chandrika married actor and politician Vijaya Kumaratunga in 1978, who was assassinated on 16 February 1988, outside his residence in the presence of Chandrika and their two children, then aged five and seven.

Their daughter, Yasodhara Kumaratunga born in 1980 and educated at Corpus Christi College, Cambridge and at St George's, University of London became a medical doctor and married Roger Walker a consultant medical practitioner from Dorset. Their son, Vimukthi Kumaratunga born in 1982 and educated at the University of Bristol became a veterinary surgeon.

== Honours and decorations ==
Ribbon bar	Honour	Date
	Commander of the Legion of Honour	2018

== See also ==
- List of political families in Sri Lanka
- President of Sri Lanka
- Kumaratunga cabinet

Political offices
Preceded by Ranil Wickremesinghe	Prime Minister of Sri Lanka; 1994	Succeeded by Sirimavo Bandaranaike
Preceded by Dingiri Banda Wijetunga	President of Sri Lanka; 1994–2005	Succeeded by Mahinda Rajapaksa
Diplomatic posts
Preceded by Maumoon Abdul Gayoom	Chairperson of SAARC; 1998	Succeeded by Sher Bahadur Deuba
