= Thilan Wijesinghe =

Sri Lankan businessman

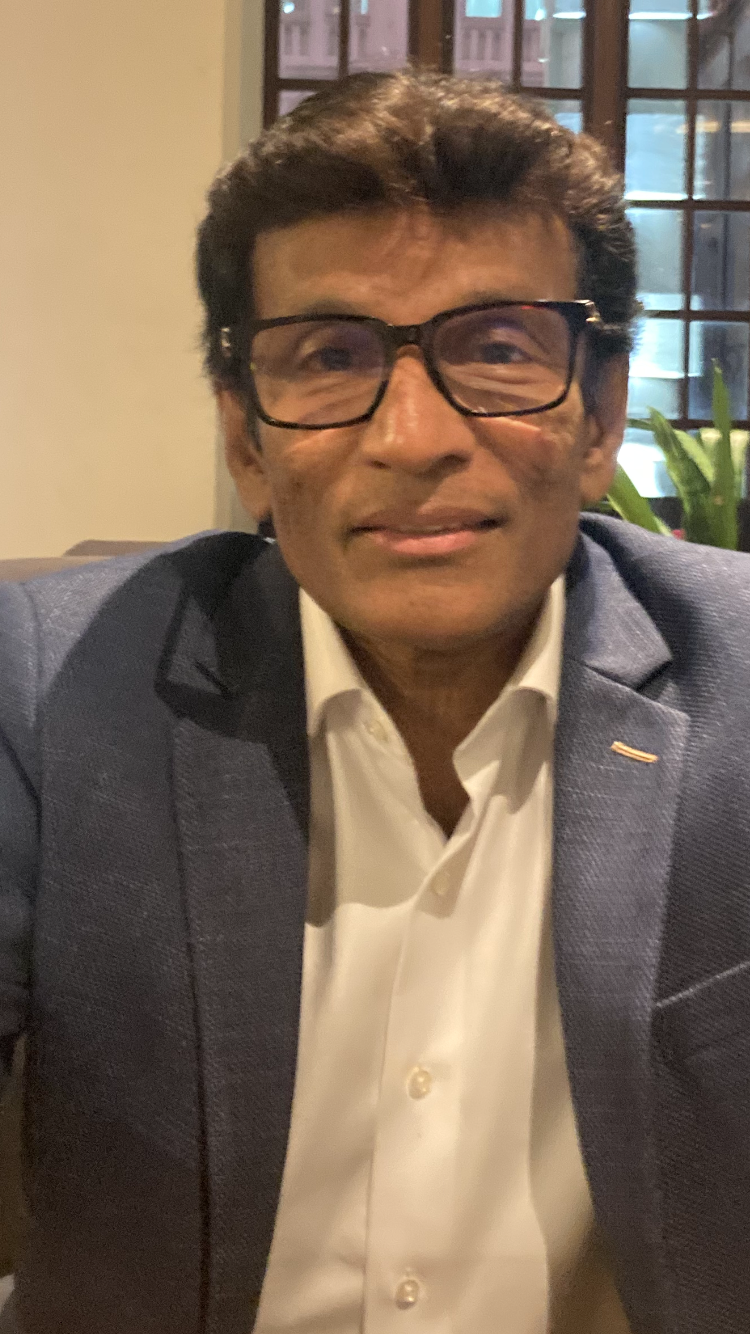
- Born: Colombo, Sri Lanka
- Education: State University of New York at Fredonia; Cornell University
- Known for: former chairman of the Board of Investment of Sri Lanka(BOI)
- Title: Chairman of Blist | TWCorp | Sapphirus Lanka | Digital Commerce Lanka

Thilan Manjith Wijesinghe is a Sri Lankan financier, entrepreneur, former cricketer and musician.

He is currently the chairman of TWCorp (Pvt) Ltd. and Sapphirus Lanka (Pvt) Ltd. Thilan was formerly the chairman and acting CEO of the National Agency for Public Private Partnerships of the Finance Ministry of Sri Lanka from 2017 to 2019, and Digital Commerce Lanka (Pvt) Ltd. which owns www.wow.lk, the largest online mall in Sri Lanka.

He is well known as a former chairman of the Board of Investment of Sri Lanka.

== Education ==
Thilan had his secondary education at Ananda College, Colombo and then pursued his university studies in the United States, obtaining three bachelor's degrees in 1984 in Business Administration from State University of New York at Fredonia, Industrial Engineering and Economics both from Cornell University.

== Career ==
Upon returning to Sri Lanka in 1985 after the completion of his studies in the United States, Thilan functioned as Senior Management Consultant specialising in strategy and market research consulting at Price Waterhouse Coopers, Colombo. He then joined as Head of Corporate Planning at Sampath Bank in 1989.

In January 1992, he pursued his entrepreneurial interests by co-founding Asia Capital Ltd, which became Sri Lanka's largest investment bank. During his tenure, Asia Capital grew from its initial investment of US$25,000 into a company with a market capitalisation of US$60 Million by August 1994, ranking among the top 10 companies listed on the Colombo Stock Exchange. The company was Sri Lanka's top stock broker in terms of market share in 1993 and 1994 and responsible for several landmark corporate finance transactions.

Thilan was a key initiator in successfully launching the Regent Sri Lanka Fund in 1993, the first ever country fund dedicated to Sri Lankan equities. He served on the Board of this Dublin-listed company for 3 years. Thilan sold his entire equity holding in Asia Capital in 1996 in view of the poor capital market outlook in the country at the time.

Thilan's success as an investment banker attracted the attention of the political leadership and, in September 1995, he was invited by the then President of Sri Lanka Chandrika Kumaratunga to the position of chairman and Director General of the Board of Investment(BOI), a statutory body directly under the President mandate with mobilising and facilitating foreign direct investment and private local capital into priority sectors of the economy. He became the youngest ever (at 35), longest serving (5 ½ years) and the first private sector full-time head of this prestigious public institution. Whilst at the BOI, he established many "firsts" including pioneering privatisation and investment transactions in ports, power and telecom sectors, housing development, software and IT, including co-founding the Sri Lanka Institute of Information Technology, now Sri Lanka's largest IT University by far. He serves this institute as Director for life. During his term, the BOI attracted the highest ever quantum of foreign direct investment in 1999 and enhanced its infrastructure investment budget 10-fold.

In 2002 Thilan decided on a change of career focus from investment banking to property and leisure development to pursue his passion for design and architecture. For 2 years he functioned as co-CEO of Sri Lanka's largest listed property and hotel company, Asian Hotels Corporation Ltd (AHC). He directed the master planning of AHC's property in Colombo 3 (including creation of the blue print for an apartment tower which sold successfully) and the landmark merger between AHC and its subsidiary Crescat Development Ltd. This was followed by the successful sale of majority control of this Group to John Keells Holdings, Sri Lanka's largest conglomerate. During his tenure AHC achieved a 400% rise in share price and 300% rise in profitability.

Having opted to pursue entrepreneurial interests after the sale of AHC, in 2004, Thilan chose to partner with MJF Group, makers of Dilmah Tea, among top 5 global brands of tea, to set up a chain of exclusive resort hotels in Sri Lanka. He then founded Sri Lanka's first hotel management company specialising in managing small luxury resorts and spas and co-founded Ceylon Tea Trails, now widely regarded as Sri Lanka's most successful boutique hotel, having won Tripadvisor awards for "Best All-inclusive Hotel (World)" category for 2009, 2010 and 2011.

He was instrumental in identifying and procuring a 500-acre land bank for future resort and holiday villa developments and played an active role in creation of The Fortress, currently among the top small luxury hotels in Sri Lanka's south coast.

Thilan was concurrently appointed Group CEO/managing director of Forbes & Walker(F&W) Group, a subsidiary of MJF Group, and Sri Lanka's largest commodity broker. During his 5-year tenure at F&W ending 2009, the Group's turnover tripled, profits increased at annual growth rate of 45% and shareholder wealth increased 4-fold. Thilan exited his investment and CEO position in F&W in January 2010, though he continues to serve as non-executive Director of MJF's leisure management and development businesses. He is also a Director of www.srilankainstyle.com, Sri Lanka's premier travel planning and ground handling company catering to up-market tourists.

In January 2010, Thilan was invited to the position of Group managing director of Overseas Realty (Ceylon) PLC (ORC) by its chairman, Mr. S.P.Tao, a pioneering property developer in Singapore and former Chairman of Singapore Land. ORC owns Sri Lanka's largest modern office building, the World Trade Centre (WTC), and Colombo city's largest contiguous block of residential and commercial land, the 18 acre Havelock City property, which is currently being developed into an integrated mixed development. Under Thilan's leadership, for period ending 2nd quarter 2010, the Group achieved robust growth in office rental rates (up 30%), office rental commitments (up 800%) and new apartment sales (up 500%), compared to the 6 months ending December 2009. Thilan relinquished his position at ORC in August 2010 to pursue entrepreneurial interests.

Having headed Sri Lanka's two largest listed property companies, to leverage on his combined skills in property and corporate finance, Thilan has recently incorporated a property investment and Development Management company, TW Corp, functioning as its chairman.

Thilan has also incubated and co-invested in several pioneering start-up ventures: namely, Sapphirus Lanka, a company that is adding value to Sri Lankan sapphire and marketing them to premium jewellers such as Tiffany and Cartier; Anything.lk, Sri Lanka's largest daily-deal based e-commerce company. Thilan is the chairman of these companies and also serves as director of several other private and public companies in a non-executive capacity.

== Cricket ==
During his schooldays he represented Ananda College, Colombo first XI cricket team and later he went on to play cricket for Tamil Union Cricket and Athletic Club, Colombo. He represented Sri Lanka A.

Thilan was the youngest and the second Anandian since 1932 ever to score a century at the Battle of the Maroons. This superlative innings established many records: the highest ever score up till then by an Anandian, the second centurion ever from Ananda in 44 years and a record opening stand of 166 with Sidath Wettimuny.

He started playing cricket when he was 9 for the under 12 team. One of his earliest cricketing memories was his father Thilak Wijesinghe, who was also an Anandian and an avid cricketer enthusiast himself, bowling tennis balls at him.

Thilan subsequently captained the Under 13 age group and all age groups thereafter. He holds the distinction of playing for the 1st XI Ananda Team at the age of 13 years.

He got his first 50 in a Big Match in 1975. This was also the year of the inaugural Ananda-Nalanda 50-over encounter; he got 76 runs and helped Ananda to win. Thilan was selected Best Schoolboy Batsman and toured Pakistan with the Sri Lanka Under 19 team in 1976. At the Ananda-Nalanda 50 over match in 1977, he scored a half century, got 2 wickets, took 2 catches and ran out 2 batsmen. At the end of the match, he walked away with all the awards – best batsman, best bowler, best fielder and Man-of-the-Match – every award that was on offer.

Thilan captained Ananda in the 50th Battle of the Maroons. During the 6 years he played for the first XI team, Thilan established the record for the highest run aggregate for an Anandian in both the Battle of the Maroons Series and the One Day Series.

Thilan's heroics at cricket extended to the Inter Club theatre as well. He debuted at the P. Saravanamuttu Trophy Division 1 Tournament for the Tamil Union Cricket Club at the age of 15 and scored his maiden century the same year, in 1975. That year, his was the only Singhalese name on the team card.

Having given up cricket after the 1979 Big Match, opting to study in the United States at Cornell University over playing for Sri Lanka, which was not yet a test playing Nation at the time, Thilan returned to cricket after a complete absence from the game for 5 years. In 1991 Thilan was picked as Skipper of the Sri Lanka "A" team for matches against Pakistan "A" and England "A". He was given the captaincy of the Sri Lanka "A" Team.

In the year 1992 Thilan permanently retired from all competitive cricket, having chosen to pursue entrepreneurial interests as a co-founder of Asia Capital PLC.

== Music ==
Thilan was born into a musical family. His maternal grand uncles were musicians who used to meet up at Thilan's mother's family house when he was young. They congregated around a piano and sang songs for three-hour-long sessions. Young Thilan in his six or seven years, was influenced by these musical rituals where one of his granduncles would be on the piano, another on the piano accordion, another on a guitar and another on a harmonica. Since they all played by ear, never having had formal music lessons in their lives, young Thilan too watched their performance and learned the art of how to create a fine rhythm by piano and later by guitar and harmonica. Since his ability on music was found by his mother, she sent him for a proper piano lesson.

Thilan originally composed the song, The Loss of Innocence.

=== Album discography ===
- The Loss of Innocence (2002) (as a member and co-founder of the band Alien Accent)
