= Somapala Dharmapriya =

Sri Lankan actor

Somapala Dharmapriya සෝමපාල ධර්මපි‍්‍රය
- Born: Somapala Dharmapriya; 29 September 1940; Jaffna, Sri Lanka
- Died: 14 September 1992 (aged 51); Colombo
- Education: Prince of Wales' College, Moratuwa
- Occupations: Actor, cinematographer
- Years active: 1956–1990
- Spouse: Princy de Silva

Somapala Dharmapriya (29 September 1940 – 14 September 1992) (Sinhala: සෝමපාල ධර්මපි‍්‍රය), was an actor and cinematographer in Sri Lankan cinema.

== Personal life ==
Fernando was born on 29 September 1940 in Jaffna even though lived in Moratuwa. He was educated at Lakshapathiya Student College, Moratuwa, Prince of Wales' College, Moratuwa and Hunumulla Central College.

In March 1990, he suffered from a malignant cancer of the tongue. Doctors had his tongue amputated and underlying teeth were also removed. He could no longer speak after the procedure and quit cinema. There was also a film festival conducted by Lester to help him. In the final days, he only depend on melted food. He died on 14 September 1992 at the age of 51. He was married to Princy de Silva.

== Career ==
In 1956 he entered cinema as a child artist with the film Rekava directed by Lester James Peries with the role "Sena". Because he spent six months in Alawwa, Bandarawela and Kelaniya for about a month for filming, he lost the school and then attended to another school. He was highly popularized with the film. After that film, Dharmapriya acted in several commercially successful films directed by Lester, including Delovak Athara, Desa Nisa and Gehenu Lamai. However, he preferred to study cinematography and the technical side of cinema. Then, he studied cinematography under Willie Blake and worked as an assistant cinematographer in the films Gamperaliya and Delowak Athara.

His maiden cinematography came through the film Adarawanthayo directed by Amaranath Jayathilake. He was the chief cinematographer in the films Pem Kurullo, Bonikka, Mawubima Nathnam Maranaya, Adara Kathawa, Salambak Handai, Salli Thibunata Madi and Mawubime Weerayo.

== Filmography ==
Year	Film	Roles	Ref.
1956	Rekava	Sena	
1966	Delovak Athara	Martin	
1679	Ran Salu	Assistant Cinematographer	
1968	Golu Hadawatha	Assistant Cinematographer	
1968	Adarawanthayo	Cinematographer	
1969	Baduth Ekka Horu	Cinematographer	
1969	Bakmaha Deege	Assistant Cinematographer	
1971	Abhirahasa	Assistant Cinematographer	
1975	Pem Kurullo	Cinematographer	
1975	Desa Nisa	Shirtless villager. Assistant Cinematographer	
1976	Madol Duwa	Assistant Cinematographer	
1978	Seetha Devi	Assistant Cinematographer	
1978	Gehenu Lamai	Cyclist. Assistant Cinematographer	
1978	Veera Puran Appu	Assistant Cinematographer	
1978	Ahasin Polawata	Assistant Cinematographer	
1980	Kinduru Kumari	Assistant Cinematographer	
1981	Tarzan, the Ape Man	Camera Operator	
1982	Hello Shyama	Assistant Cinematographer	
1983	Bonikka	Cinematographer	
1983	Kaliyugaya	Assistant Cinematographer	
1985	Adara Kathawa	Cinematographer	
1985	Mawubima Nathnam Maranaya	Cinematographer	
1985	Yuganthaya	Assistant Cinematographer	
1987	Sathyagrahanaya	Cinematographer	
1988	Sagara Jalaya Madi Handuwa	Assistant Cinematographer	
1991	Salambak Handai	Cinematographer	
1991	Awaragira	Assistant Cinematographer	
1993	Juriya Mamai	Cinematographer	
1994	Mawubime Veerayo	Cinematographer	
2000	Hansa Vilapaya	Cinematographer	
