= Ministry of Minor Export Crop Promotion =

Government ministry of Sri Lanka

Agency overview
- Formed: 11 November 2010; 15 years ago
- Jurisdiction: Sri Lanka
- Employees: 890
- Annual budget: Rs .940,970 Billion
- Agency executive: Vajira Narampanawa, Secretary
- Website: mcropmin.lk

The Ministry of Minor Export Crop Promotion is the Sri Lankan government ministry responsible for “leading the spice industry to achieve the excellence in cultivation, production, marketing and promotion.”

== List of ministers ==
Minister of Minor Export Crop Promotion of Sri Lanka
- Ministry of Minor Export Crop Promotion
- Inaugural holder: Reginald Cooray
- Formation: 22 November 2010
- Website: mcropmin.lk

The Minister of Minor Export Crop Promotion is an appointment in the Cabinet of Sri Lanka.

Parties

Sri Lanka Freedom Party United National Party

Name	Portrait	Party	Tenure	President
Reginald Cooray		Sri Lanka Freedom Party	22 November 2010 - 9 January 2015	Mahinda Rajapaksa

== See also ==
- List of ministries of Sri Lanka
