= White Flowers for the Dead =

Ahasin Polowata
- Directed by: Lester James Peries
- Written by: Tissa Abeysekera; Eileen Siriwardene (book)
- Produced by: U. W. Sumathipala
- Starring: Tony Ranasinghe; Sriyani Amarasena; Vasanthi Chathurani
- Cinematography: Donald Karunaratne
- Edited by: Sumitra Peries
- Music by: Nimal Mendis
- Release date: 1978
- Running time: 90 minutes
- Country: Sri Lanka
- Language: Sinhala

Ahasin Polowata (English: White Flowers for the Dead, Sinhala: අහසින් පොලොවට) is a 1978 Sri Lankan drama film directed by Dr Lester James Peries and written by Tissa Abeysekara. The film stars Tony Ranasinghe as Sarath, an abusive husband who is haunted by his wife's death.

Peries made the film as a favour to D. B. I. S. Siriwardene who was ardent that Peries direct a film based on his wife, Eileen's book. It was well received in Sri Lanka, critically and commercially, and made appearances at several foreign film festivals including the Cairo International Film Festival where it won the Best Film from the Third World award.

== Plot ==
Dr. Sarath (Tony Ranasinghe) domineers over his timid wife Vineetha (Sriyani Amarasena). When she is to have a Caesarean delivery of their baby, Sarath refuses to be present even though he himself is a doctor. She dies during surgery and Sarath is forced to live with the spectre of his wife hanging over him.

== Cast ==
- Tony Ranasinghe as Sarath
- Sriyani Amarasena as Vineetha
- Vijaya Kumaratunga as Sarath's friend, Lalith
- Vasanthi Chathurani as Pushpa, Vineetha's sister
- Rukmani Devi as Sarath's aunt
- Thalatha Gunasekara
- Shanthi Lekha
- D. R. Nanayakkara
- Geetha Kumarasinghe
- Eddie Junior
- Ajith Jinadasa
- Asanka Monarawila
- Mapa Gunaratne
- Ebert Wijesinghe
- Daya Alwis

== Awards ==
- Most outstanding film from a Third World country at the 3rd International Film Festival in Cairo in 1978.
- Best Actor Presidential Film Awards 1979 - Tony Ranasinghe.
- Best Direction Presidential Film Awards 1979 - Lester James Peries.
- Best Editor Presidential Film Awards 1979 - Sumithra Peris.
- Best Cinematographer Presidential Film Awards 1979 - Donald Karunarathna.
- Best Script Writer Presidential Film Awards 1979 - Tissa Abeysekara.
- Best Playback Singer Female Presidential Film Awards 1979 - Rukmani Devi ("Doi Doi").
