= Morris Rajapaksa =

Sri Lankan politician (died 1995)

3rd Chief Minister of Western Province
- In office 22 August 1994 – 11 July 1995
- Preceded by: Chandrika Kumaratunga
- Succeeded by: Susil Premajayanth

Personal details
- Died: 11 July 1995
- Party: Sri Lanka Freedom Party
- Other political affiliations: People's Alliance

Morris Rajapaksa (died 11 July 1995) was the 3rd Chief Minister of Western Province. He was appointed on 22 August 1994 succeeding Chandrika Kumaratunga, after she was elected as Prime Minister of Sri Lanka. Rajapaska served as Chief Minister until his death on 11 July 1995. He was succeeded by Susil Premajayanth.

Political offices
Preceded by Chandrika Kumaratunga	Chief Minister of Western Province; 1994–1995	Succeeded by Susil Premajayanth
