= Isura Devapriya =

Sri Lankan politician

8th Chief Minister of Western Province
- In office 8 September 2015 – 21 April 2019
- Preceded by: Prasanna Ranatunga

Personal details
- Born: Sri Lanka
- Citizenship: Sri Lankan
- Party: Sri Lanka Freedom Party
- Spouse: Arjuna Mirani Kolombage
- Children: Arjuna Danushika (daughter)
- Education: Ananda Sastralaya, Kotte

Isura Devapriya is a Sri Lankan politician who was the Chief Minister of the Western Province. He was appointed to the position on 8 September 2015, following the election of his predecessor, Prasanna Ranatunga, to parliament.

== Controversies ==
=== Corruption ===
Isura Devapriya spend luxury Belgium chair import 125 chairs, each costing up to LKR 640,000 for the Western Provincial Council. Estimate total cost up to LKR 80 million. Devapriya explained that the newly constructed 15-story provincial council building, with its modern facilities, requires modern furniture.

The Ceylon Teachers Union (CTU) has raised concerns that Isura Devapriya in the Western Province are altering school name boards to include their own name like Madiwela Sri Rahula Vidyalaya has been renamed Isuru Maha Vidyalaya, allegedly as a form of gratitude for their contributions to the schools.

Minister Nalinda Jayathissa, Chief Government Whip, disclosed details of payments made from the President's Fund to various politicians between 2005 and 2024. The list of recipients includes Isura Devapriya.
