= List of chief ministers of Western Province =

Chief Minister of Western Province
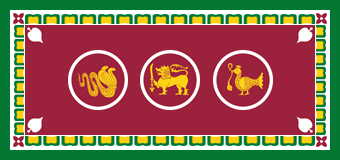
- Flag of Western Province, Sri Lanka
- Incumbent; Isura Devapriya since 8 September 2015
- Board of Ministers of the Western Province
- Style: The Honourable
- Member of: Western Provincial Council
- Appointer: K. C. Logeswaran
- Inaugural holder: Susil Moonesinghe
- Formation: 3 February 1988
- Website: Western Provincial Council

The chief minister of Western Province, Sri Lanka, is the head of the provincial board of ministers, a body which aids and advises the governor, the head of the provincial government, in the exercise of his executive power. The governor appoints as chief minister the member of the Western Provincial Council who, in his opinion, commands the support of a majority of that council. The current chief minister is Isura Devapriya.

== Chief ministers ==
Sri Lanka Freedom Party United National Party

No.	Name	Portrait	Party	Took office	Left office	Refs
1	Susil Moonesinghe		United National Party	9 June 1988	16 March 1993	
2	Chandrika Kumaratunga		Sri Lanka Freedom Party	21 May 1993	21 August 1994	
3	Morris Rajapaksa		Sri Lanka Freedom Party	22 August 1994	11 July 1995	
4	Susil Premajayanth		Sri Lanka Freedom Party	13 July 1995	June 1998	
	Vacant			June 1998	April 1999	
(4)	Susil Premajayanth		Sri Lanka Freedom Party	April 1999	9 November 2000	
5	Reginald Cooray		Sri Lanka Freedom Party	9 November 2000	22 June 2005	
6	Nandana Mendis		Sri Lanka Freedom Party	22 June 2005	3 July 2005	
(5)	Reginald Cooray		Sri Lanka Freedom Party	3 July 2005	4 May 2009	
7	Prasanna Ranatunga		Sri Lanka Freedom Party	4 May 2009	1 September 2015	
8	Isura Devapriya		Sri Lanka Freedom Party	8 September 2015		
