= Asanka Nawaratne =

Sri Lankan politician, provincial Councillor, and Member of Parliament

Hon. Asanka Navarathne
- අසංක නවරත්න அசங்க நவரத்ன
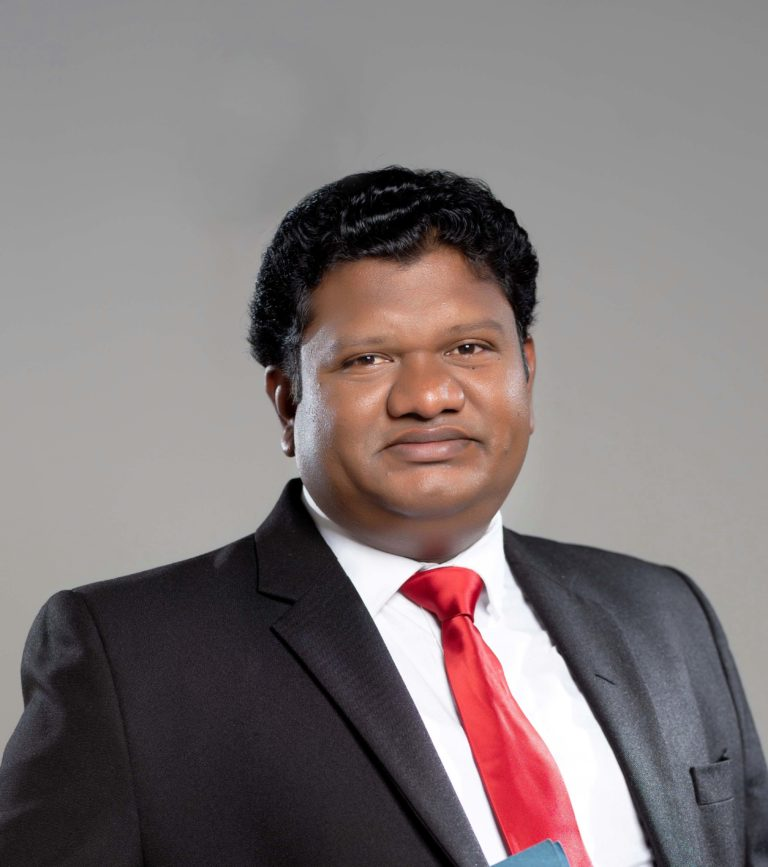

Member of Parliament for Kurunegala District
- In office 2020–2024

Member of the North Western Provincial Council for Kurunegala District
- In office 2009–2018

Personal details
- Born: Asanka Samithajeewa Navarathne; 9 January 1981 (age 45) Kurunegala
- Party: Sri Lanka People's Party
- Other political affiliations: Sri Lanka People's Freedom Alliance
- Website: www.slmp.lk

Asanka Samithajeewa Navarathne (born 9 January 1981) is a Sri Lankan politician, former provincial councillor and former Member of Parliament.

Nawaratne was born on 9 January 1981. He is leader of the Sri Lanka People's Party. He was a member of Kurunegala Divisional Council and the North Western Provincial Council. He contested the 2015 parliamentary election as one of the United People's Freedom Alliance (UPFA) electoral alliance's candidates in Kurunegala District but failed to get elected after coming 17th amongst the UPFA candidates. He contested the 2020 parliamentary election as a Sri Lanka People's Freedom Alliance electoral alliance candidate in Kurunegala District and was elected to the Parliament of Sri Lanka.

Electoral history of Asanka Navarathne
Election	Constituency	Party	Alliance	Votes	Result
2009 provincial	Kurunegala District		United People's Freedom Alliance	30,758	Elected
2013 provincial	Kurunegala District	Sri Lanka People's Party	United People's Freedom Alliance	32,450	Elected
2015 parliamentary	Kurunegala District	Sri Lanka People's Party	United People's Freedom Alliance	21,395	Not elected
2020 parliamentary	Kurunegala District	Sri Lanka People's Party	Sri Lanka People's Freedom Alliance	82,779	Elected
