= Vijaya Kumaratunga =

Sri Lankan actor, playback singer and politician (1945–1988)

Vijaya Kumaratunga විජය කුමාරතුංග விஜய குமாரதுங்க
- Born: Kovilage Anton Vijaya Kumaranatunga; 9 October 1945; Ragama, British Ceylon
- Died: 16 February 1988 (aged 42); Polhengoda, Sri Lanka
- Cause of death: Assassination
- Other name: Vijey
- Education: St. Benedict's College; De Mazenod College
- Occupations: Actor; Playback singer; Politician
- Years active: 1969–1988
- Political party: Sri Lanka Mahajana Party
- Spouse: Chandrika Kumaratunga (m. 1978)
- Children: 2
- Relatives: Bandaranaike family Carlo Fonseka; Jeewan Kumaranatunga; Ranjan Ramanayake
- Awards: Sarasaviya Most Popular Actor Award

Kovilage Anton Vijaya Kumaranatunga (Sinhala: කොවිලගේ ඇන්ටන් විජය කුමාරණතුංග; Tamil: விஜய குமாரணதுங்க; 9 October 1945 – 16 February 1988), popularly known as Vijaya Kumaratunga, was a Sri Lankan film actor, playback singer and politician regarded as one of the most popular icons in Sri Lankan cinema of all time. He was married to former Sri Lankan President Chandrika Kumaranatunga from 1978 until his assassination in 1988. He was the founder of Sri Lanka Mahajana Party.

== Early life ==
Kovilage Anton Vijaya Kumaranatunga was born on 9 October 1945, at the government hospital in Ragama to Roman Catholic parents. His father was Kovilage Benjamin Kumaratunga, a village headman and mother was Clara Beatrice Perera. The youngest of four siblings, Vijaya had two elder brothers: Sydney and Vivian and one elder sister: Rupa. He received his primary education at Seeduwa Davisamara Maha Vidyalaya, secondary education at St. Benedict's College, Kotahena and De Mazenod College, Kandana. During his school days, he excelled at singing, drama and oratory. Following his schooling, Kumaratunga joined the Ceylon Police Force as a Sub Inspector, but left soon after.

== Film career ==
He first appears in a lead role as a university student named Bandu in the 1969 blockbuster Hanthane Kathawa directed by Sugathapala Senarath Yapa. But according to local film historians, the first time he acted in front of a camera was in the film Manamalayo three years prior. Although a Romeo and Juliet story was made in 1969, he was not the lead actor.

In a career that spanned nearly two decades, he contributed to more than 120 films, 114 of which starred the protagonist. Some of his most popular films include Ahas Gauwa (1974), Eya Den Loku Lamayek (1975), Ponmani (1977), Bambaru Avith (1977), Ganga Addara (1980), Baddegama (1980), Paradige (1980), Maha Gedara (1980), Kedapathaka Chaya (1989), and Kristhu Charithaya (1990). He acted in one English-language film, The God King, and one Tamil film, Nanguram. Meanwhile, the Vijaya-Malini era also came to the fore when he became the dream boy in the 1980s Sinhala cinema. According to the critic Gamini Weragama, Vijaya's performance in the film Maruwa Samaga Wase is close to Toshiro Mifune's supernatural role in Rashomon.

He also performed as a playback singer in several films; recorded more than 100 songs; and produced two films, Waradata Danduwam and Samawa which was released after his death. From 1983 to 1988 (once after the assassination) he was a consistently popular actor at six Sarasaviya Award Ceremonies. But he received the award for the Best Actor only for the role in Kedapathaka Chaya at the OCIC and the Swarna Sankha Festival in 1989, but he was not fortunate enough to see it. After two years of demise, he won the Sarasaviya Award for Best Playback singer for his song 'Walakulak Gena Muwa Karumu Hiru' for Saharawe Sihiniya and his song 'Sara Guwana Vida Neguna' for the Dolos Mahe Pahana. The only proof that he turned to singing as well as songwriting is the song 'Mulu Hadinma Oba Hata Adarei'.

== Political career ==
In 1974, Kumaratunga started his political career in the Lanka Sama Samaja Party (LSSP). He later joined the Sri Lanka Freedom Party (SLFP) and became its vice secretary.

In 1977, he ran unsuccessfully for the Katana seat in Parliament. Five years later, he was active in the 1982 presidential campaign of Hector Kobbekaduwa. After the election, he was accused of being a Naxalite and jailed under the emergency regulations of President J. R. Jayewardene, but he was never charged.

He ran as the SLFP candidate in a by-election in Mahara in 1983 and was threatened by United National Party (UNP) supporters. An attempt was made on his life, and one of his friends was killed. Kumaratunga won the first vote count, and a recount was ordered. At that point, a blackout occurred at the counting centre. By the time electricity was restored, the UNP candidate had recorded a victory by a few votes. The opposition alleged that someone had "eaten some of Vijaya's votes to ensure UNP victory".

On 22 January 1984 he founded the Sri Lanka Mahajana Party (SLMP) and became its first national organizer, which campaigned for peace in the Sri Lankan Civil War. Under his new party, he contested a Minneriya by-election and finished second, behind the UNP candidate—relegating his old party, SLFP, to third place. The SLMP went on to contest several other by-elections, including in Kundasale and Habaraduwa, but did not live up to expectations.

in 1986, Kumaranatunga visited Jaffna, then controlled by the Liberation Tigers of Tamil Eelam (LTTE). He visited the Nallur Murugan Temple and met with local Tamil civilians, as well as several LTTE youth leaders.

In his final public address, to a large crowd in Colombo's Campbell Park on 28 January 1988, Kumaratunga lashed out at the UNP, SLFP, and Janatha Vimuthki Peramuna (JVP) parties for failing to address the needs of the hour. He also voiced concerns about the SLFP's links with the JVP, a Marxist–Leninist party involved in two armed uprisings against the Sri Lankan government.

In 1988, the SLMP reached an agreement with several other left-wing parties—including the LSSP, Nava Sama Samaja Party (NSSP), Sri Lanka Communist Party, and Eelam People's Revolutionary Liberation Front (EPRLF)—to form the United Socialist Alliance (USA). A few days prior to the establishment of the new alliance, Kumaranatunga was assassinated. The agreement was signed by party leaders at his funeral.

The USA won a large number of seats in the newly formed provincial councils in an election boycotted by the main opposition SLFP. However, in the 1988 presidential election, the USA candidate, Ossie Abeygunasekera, finished in last place. In the 1989 parliamentary elections, USA candidates won three seats, but none of the winners represented the SLMP.

== Personal life ==
On 20 February 1978, Kumaratunga married Chandrika Bandaranaike, with whom he had two children. Bandaranaike was the daughter of two former prime ministers, S. W. R. D. Bandaranaike and Sirimavo Bandaranaike, and would later become president of Sri Lanka.

== Death and funeral ==
Kumaratunga was shot in the head with a Type 56 assault rifle outside his home on the outskirts of Colombo on 16 February 1988 by Lionel Ranasinghe, alias Gamini. Ranasinghe confessed to the murder under questioning by the Criminal Investigation Department. In a 141-page statement, he said he had been carrying out orders given to him by the Deshapremi Janatha Viyaparaya (Patriotic People's Movement), the military arm of the JVP, which was responsible for multiple assassinations in the late 1980s. After Chandrika Kumaratunga became president in 1994, she appointed a Presidential Commission of Inquiry which inquired into the assassination, its report alleged that President Ranasinghe Premadasa of the UNP and two government ministers were behind the Kumaranatunga assassination without any direct evidence.

Kumaratunga's funeral, on 21 February 1988, attracted huge crowds and was the first funeral to be broadcast live on Sri Lankan television (by the Sri Lanka Rupavahini Corporation). It was held at Independence Square in Colombo as a state funeral, even though he represented the opposition to the UNP government. The day of his assassination is widely known as "The Horrible Tuesday" or "The Darkest Tuesday in Sri Lankan History" (He was assassinated on a Tuesday). His death is still mourned by many people in Sri Lanka.

== Filmography ==
Year	Film	Role	Notes
1967	Manamalayo		Acting debut
1969	Romio Juliet Kathawak		
1969	Hanthane Kathawa	Bandu	First leading role
1970	Priyanga		
1971	Ran Onchilla	Wickrama	
1971	Abirahasa		
1971	Kesara Sinhayo	Gamini	
1971	Hathara Denama Surayo	Vijey	
1971	Samanala Kumariyo		
1971	Bindunu Hadawath		Also film's producer
1972	Me Desa Kumatada	Vijaya Kumaratunga	
1972	Edath Sooraya Adath Sooraya		Guest Appearance
1972	Vana Raja		
1972	Adare Hithenawa Dakkama	Premkumara	
1973	Thushara	Sampath	
1973	Hathdinnath Tharu		
1973	Dahakin Ekek		
1973	Hondama Welawa		
1974	Susee	Laurie Mahaththaya	
1974	Ahas Gauwa		
1974	Duleeka	Sumith	
1974	Sanakeliya	Rohitha Radalage	
1974	The God King	Lalith	English-language film
1975	Pem Kurullo		
1975	Sikuruliya	Paala	
1975	Lassana Dawasak		
1975	Sangeetha	Wimal, Vijaya (Two births)	
1976	Pradeepe Ma Wewa		
1976	Vasana		
1976	Diyamanthi		
1976	Unnath Dahai Malath Dahai		
1976	Adarei Man Adarei		
1977	Sakunthala		
1977	Hithuvoth Hithuvamai	Manju, Mohan, Chukki	
1977	Maruwa Samaga Wase	Maru Sira	
1977	Hariyanakota Ohoma Thamai		
1977	Eya Den Loku Lamayek	Village Officer	
1977	Pembara Madhu	Senaka	
1978	Vishmaya		
1978	Kundala Keshi	Saththuka	
1978	Sandawata Ran Tharu		
1978	Anupama	Asitha	
1978	Selinge Walawuwa		
1978	Bambaru Awith	Victor	
1978	Sally		
1978	Kumara Kumariyo	Sagara	
1978	Ahasin Polowata		
1979	Gahaniyak		
1979	Podi Malli	Gunapala aka Peter	
1979	Hingana Kolla	Saiya aka Morris Abeysiriwardena	
1979	Monarathenna	Piyasoma	
1979	Eka Hitha		
1979	Nangooram		Tamil film
1979	Akke Mata Awasara	Ajith	
1980	Raja Dawasak		
1980	Ganga Addara	Dr. Sarath Pathirana	
1980	Karumakkarayo	Wilison	
1980	Kinduru Kumari	Podde	
1980	Para Dige	Chandare	
1980	Tak Tik Tuk	Sarath	
1980	Kanchana	Ajith	
1981	Beddegama	Babun	Based on Leonard Wolf's Baddegama
1981	Geethika	Sampath	
1981	Anjana	Saliya	
1981	Suriyakantha	Hemantha	
1981	Valampuri	Heen Banda	
1982	Yasa Isuru	ASP Mahesh Gunasekara	
1982	Mihidum Sihina	Vijitha	
1982	Kiri Suwanda	Meril	
1982	Rahasak Nathi Rahasak		
1982	Maha Gedara	Nandana / His father	
1982	Kadawunu Poronduwa (New)	Samson	
1982	Newatha Hamuwemu	Dual-role	
1982	Paramitha	Lassana	
1982	Bicykale	Ajith	
1983	Samanala Sihina		
1983	Sivu Rangasena		
1983	Pasa Mithuro		Guest Appearance
1983	Sandamali		
1984	Kokila		
1984	Jaya Sikurui	Vijey	
1984	Binaree Saha Sudu Banda	Sudu Banda	
1984	Welle Thenu Maliga	Christopher	
1984	Rana Derana	Ranasinghe Arachchi	
1986	Devuduwa	Anton	
1986	Peralikarayo	Vijey/Samson	Dual role
1986	Jaya Apitai	Sooryaa	
1986	Gimhane Gee Naade		
1986	Pooja		
1987	Yugayen Yugayata		
1987	Yukthiyada Shakthiyada		
1987	Kawuluwa		
1987	Raja Wedakarayo	Inspector Ramesh	
1987	Ran Damwel		
1987	Obatai Priye Adare	Ravi	
1987	Ahinsa		Guest Appearance
1989	Mamai Raja	Sampath	Released Posthumously
1989	Kadapathaka Chaya	Dhanarathna	Released Posthumously
1989	Badulu Kochchiya		Released Posthumously
1989	Nommara 17	Vijey aka Nommara 17	Released Posthumously
1989	Varadata Danduvam		Released Posthumously, Also film's producer
1989	Randenigala Sinhaya		Released Posthumously, As additional Cameraman (Uncredited) (Only film as a Cameraman)
1990	Dese Mal Pipila	Vijey	Released Posthumously
1990	Thanha Asha	Mahesh	Released Posthumously
1990	Veera Udara		Released Posthumously, Guest appearance
1990	Madu Sihina	Mr. Sandagala	Released Posthumously
1990	Christhu Charithaya	Jesus	Released Posthumously
1990	Saharawe Sihinaya		Released Posthumously, Sarasaviya Award for Best Playback Singer
1991	Madhusamaya	Jagath	Released Posthumously
1993	Soorayan Athara Veeraya	Sarath	Released Posthumously
1994	Vijaya Geetha		Released Posthumously
1994	Shakthi		Released Posthumously
1995	Hitha Honda Soorayo		Released Posthumously
1998	Aya Obata Barai		Released Posthumously

== Electoral history ==
Electoral history of Vijaya Kumaratunga
Election	Constituency	Party	Votes	%	Result
1977 parliamentary	Katana	SLFP	19,738	43.93	2nd
1983 parliamentary-by	Mahara	SLFP	24,899	47.90	2nd
1984 parliamentary-by	Minneriya	SLMP	10,568	27.85	2nd

== See also ==
- List of political families in Sri Lanka
