= Sugathapala Senarath Yapa =

Sri Lankan lyricist and director (1935–2024)

- සුගතපාල සෙනරත් යාපා
- Born: Sugathapala Senarath Yapa; 10 November 1935; Eraluwa, Akuressa, British Ceylon
- Died: 25 August 2024 (aged 88)
- Education: Rakwana Maha Vidyalaya; Gankanda Central College -Pelmadulla
- Occupations: Director, Producer, Screenplay writer, lyricist
- Years active: 1960–1984
- Spouse: Edippuliarachchige Dona Violet Somalatha (m. 1967)
- Children: 2
- Parents: David Senarath Yapa (father); Pallewattakoralage Biatrice Yapa (mother)

Kala Suri Sugathapala Senarath Yapa (සුගතපාල සෙනරත් යාපා) [Sinhala], 10 November 1935 – 25 August 2024) was a Sri Lankan film director, screenwriter, producer and lyricist. His career in Sri Lankan cinema spanned from 1960 to 1984.

== Personal life ==
Sugathapala Senarath Yapa was born in Eraluwa, Akuressa on 10 November 1935, as the eldest child of his parents, David Senarath Yapa and Pallewattakoralage Biatrice Yapa. He started primary education from Rakwana Maha Vidyalaya and then completed secondary education from Pelmadulla Central College. He has one younger sister. After the death of parents, Grandmother took care of him and his sister.

He worked as a ticket salesman at Ariyapala Theater. His cousin, L. M. Perera was a comedian. Under his guidance, he worked as a counter clerk in Touring Cinema in 1959. Then he passed clerical exams and shifted to the Labour Department and worked from 1968 to 1974.

Yapa was married to Edippuliarachchige Dona Violet Somalatha. The wedding was celebrated on 13 March 1967. The couple has one son - Muditha Dharshana - and one daughter, Subhani Ganga.

After becoming critically ill with paralysis, Yapa used wheelchair since. He died on 25 August 2024, at the age of 88.

== Career ==
Yapa acted in school plays and produced the school plays Sudo Sudu and Pinbath. His Labour division head Asoka Peiris made a play called Kuweni where he acted in small role.

During his work at Labour Department, he joined with Radio Ceylon. He started to work in radio play Gora which was an adaptation of Rabindranath Tagore's work. He also acted in the 1962 film Daskon directed by Upali Wanasinghe. During the work at Radio Ceylon, he met Mahagama Sekara and joined to "Kale Pela" founded by G. D. L. Perera. Yapa acted in Perera's maiden cinema direction Saama. The film also marked debut of Denawaka Hamine and Leonie Kothalawala.

After few years, he became the Secretary and Treasurer of Kala Pela Cultural Society from 1963 to 1968. However he resigned from the post in few years to make the pathway to cinema direction. He was also the president of Art Circle from 1968 to 1974. In 1969, Yapa made his maiden cinema direction Hanthane Kathawa which made a hallmark in Sinhala cinema. The film also marked the debut of Vijaya Kumaratunga. A relative of Wijaya Dharma Sri called Majestic Mudalali found ten others and made the money to produce the film. Each of them spend one lakh and collected 1 million for its production. Later, Yapa named them as the Contemporary Film Company. The company was located at No. 40 Heg Lane, Bambalapitiya. After the casting, they finished shooting in two and a half days. Post production of the film was completed at the Dalugama University Studios. With the film, he introduced the kiss to Sinhala cinema. This incident led to a huge criticism. On 30 December 1969, Hanthane Kathawa was screened as the 205th film. It is also the foremost cinema that provided the backdrop for the cinema of the 1970s. The film screened for more than 100 days.

In the same year, he won Silver Peacock Award at the New Delhi Film Festival for his first docudrama Minisa saha Kaputa. In 1977, he directed his second feature film Pembara Madhu and then third film Induta Mal Mitak in 1981. The film Pembara Madhu, which was banned twice and allowed to be re-screened, made a complete naked appearance for the first time Sinhala cinema. The Board of Inquiry did not cut it. On 22 April 1977 and it premiered as the 353rd film. However Induta Mal Mitak was not popularized as first two films. He made the short film Piya Saha Daruwo afterwards.

Yapa also made 28 other documentaries for the Government Film Unit including Garunda Gala, Maha Sayuren Diya Dothak, Udawadiya Mal, Sri Maha Bodhin Wahanse and Dalada Wahanse. From 1977 to 1982 he was the president of Government Film Unit, Welfare Association, Sri Lanka. In 1982, Yapa was appointed the general secretary of "Janamaddiya Shilpeenge Sangamaya" (Journalists Society). In 1989 he was appointed the News Director of Rupavahini Corporation where he retired on 17 November 1990. In 2002, Yapa was appointed the Government Film Advisor under UNP government.

In 2016, he was honored with Rana Thisara Award at Sarasaviya Film Festival. On 27 July 2019, he was awarded Swarna Sankha Sinha Award for Lifetime Achievement at 19th Presidential Cinema Awards Ceremony. A tribute to his career was made at 4th Agenda 14 Short Film Festival in 2015. In 2021, he was honored with lifetime achievement award during the ceremony held for 21 artists who made an invaluable contribution to Sinhala cinema in the early decades of Sinhala Cinema.

== Filmography ==
Year	Film	Roles	Ref.
1962	Daskon	Actor	
1965	Saama	Actor, Lyricist	
1969	Hanthane Kathawa	Director, screenwriter	
1977	Pembara Madhu	Director, Lyricist	
1981	Induta Mal Mitak	Director	
1984	Deveni Gamana	Lyricist	
