= Hanthane Kathawa =

1969 film

- Directed by: Chathura Prasad
- Written by: Dharmasena Pathiraja; Berty Gunasekara; Berty Jayasekera
- Produced by: Sasindu Prabhashana
- Starring: Swarna Mallawarachchi; Vijaya Kumaratunga; Tony Ranasinghe
- Cinematography: Sumitta Amarasinghe
- Edited by: Titus Thotawatte
- Music by: Premasiri Khemadasa
- Release date: 30 December 1969
- Country: Sri Lanka
- Language: Sinhala

Hanthane Kathawa (Sinhalese language word means "Story of Hanthana") is a 1969 film based on a love story of university students of Sri Lanka. It was directed by famous Sri Lankan film director Sugathapala Senarath Yapa and screened on December 30, 1969. This film also remarks the cinema debut of famous actor Vijaya Kumaratunga.

== Synopsis ==
Love story of Hanthane. The love story based on some students of University of Peradeniya ( Hanthana area ).The university formerly known as University of ceylon .

== Cast ==
- Vijaya Kumaratunga
- Amarasiri Kalansuriya
- Tony Ranasinghe as Anura
- Swarna Mallawarachchi
- J. B. L. Gunasekera as Father
- Sobani Amarasinghe
- Sunila Jayanthi
- Denawaka Hamine
- Daya Thennakoon
- Samanthi Lanerolle
- Edmund Jayasinghe
- Dharmadasa Kuruppu
- Berty Jayasekera
