= Sri Lanka Mahajana Pakshaya =

Political party in Sri Lanka

Sri Lanka People's Party Sri Lanka Mahajana Pakshaya
- Sinhala name: ශ්‍රී ලංකා මහජන පක්ෂය
- Leader: Asanka Nawaratne
- President: Alfred Ramanayake
- Secretary-General: Asanka Nawaratne
- Founder: Vijaya Kumaranatunga
- Founded: 22 January 1984 (42 years ago)
- Headquarters: 25, Linkwood Place, Wehera, Kurunegala, Sri Lanka
- Student wing: Sri Lanka Mahajana Students Union
- Youth wing: Sri Lanka Mahajana Youth Federation
- Trade Union: Sri Lanka Mahajana Trade Union Federation
- Ideology: Social democracy
- Political position: Center-left
- National affiliation: New Democratic Front
- Parliament of Sri Lanka: 0 / 225
- Local Government: 5 / 7,842

Election symbol
- Eye

Website
- slmp.lk

The Sri Lanka Mahajana Pakshaya (SLMP; Sri Lanka People's Party) is a political party in Sri Lanka, founded in 1984 by Vijaya Kumaranatunga.

== History ==
=== 1980s ===
Vijaya Kumaranatunga founded the party in 1984 and led it until his assassination in 1988. His wife, Chandrika Kumaranatunga, led the party for a short time after his death.

The SLMP supported the Provincial Council Act and ran against the United National Party (UNP) in 1988. The SLMP candidate, Ossie Abeygunasekera, placed third in that year's presidential election with 235,719 votes (4.63%). Abeygunasekara served as the party's leader until he crossed over to the UNP in 1993.

The party lost 117 leading members during the revolution of 1988–89, including Vijaya Kumaranatunga, Pohoddaramulle Pemaloka Thero, T. B. Wijesuriya, and Deva Bandara Senarathne.

Shortly after Kumaranatunga's assassination, the SLMP joined hands with the Communist Party of Sri Lanka, the Lanka Sama Samaja Party, and the Nava Sama Samaja Party to form the United Socialist Alliance. In the general election of 1989, the alliance received 160,271 votes (2.86%) and three seats in Parliament.

=== 1990s ===
After Abeygunasekera left the party, Y. P. de Silva became its leader. Under him, in 1993, the SLMP joined the People's Alliance.

The People's Alliance won the 1994 presidential election, and Chandrika Kumaranatunga became the president of Sri Lanka. In the general election the same year, two members were elected to Parliament: Bharatha Luxman Premachandra for the Colombo District, and Y. P. de Silva from the national list. De Silva was named deputy minister of foods.

After de Silva's death, Dr Ranjith Navarathne became the party leader in 1997.

=== 2000s ===
In the 2000 general election, Dr Navarathne was elected to Parliament from the Kurunegala District. He signed a memorandum of understanding with the United People's Freedom Alliance in 2004. In the legislative elections on 2 April 2004, the United People's Freedom Alliance won 45.6% of the popular vote and 105 out of 225 seats.

Dr Navarathne died on 1 May 2013, and his son, Asanka Nawaratne, the deputy general secretary of the party, succeeded him.

=== 2020s ===
In the Presidential election 2024, the Sri Lanka Mahajana Party supported President Ranil Wickremesinghe.
