= Board of Investment of Sri Lanka =

Investment promotion agency

- ශ්‍රී ලංකා ආයෝජන මණ්ඩලය இலங்கை முதலீட்டுச் சபை

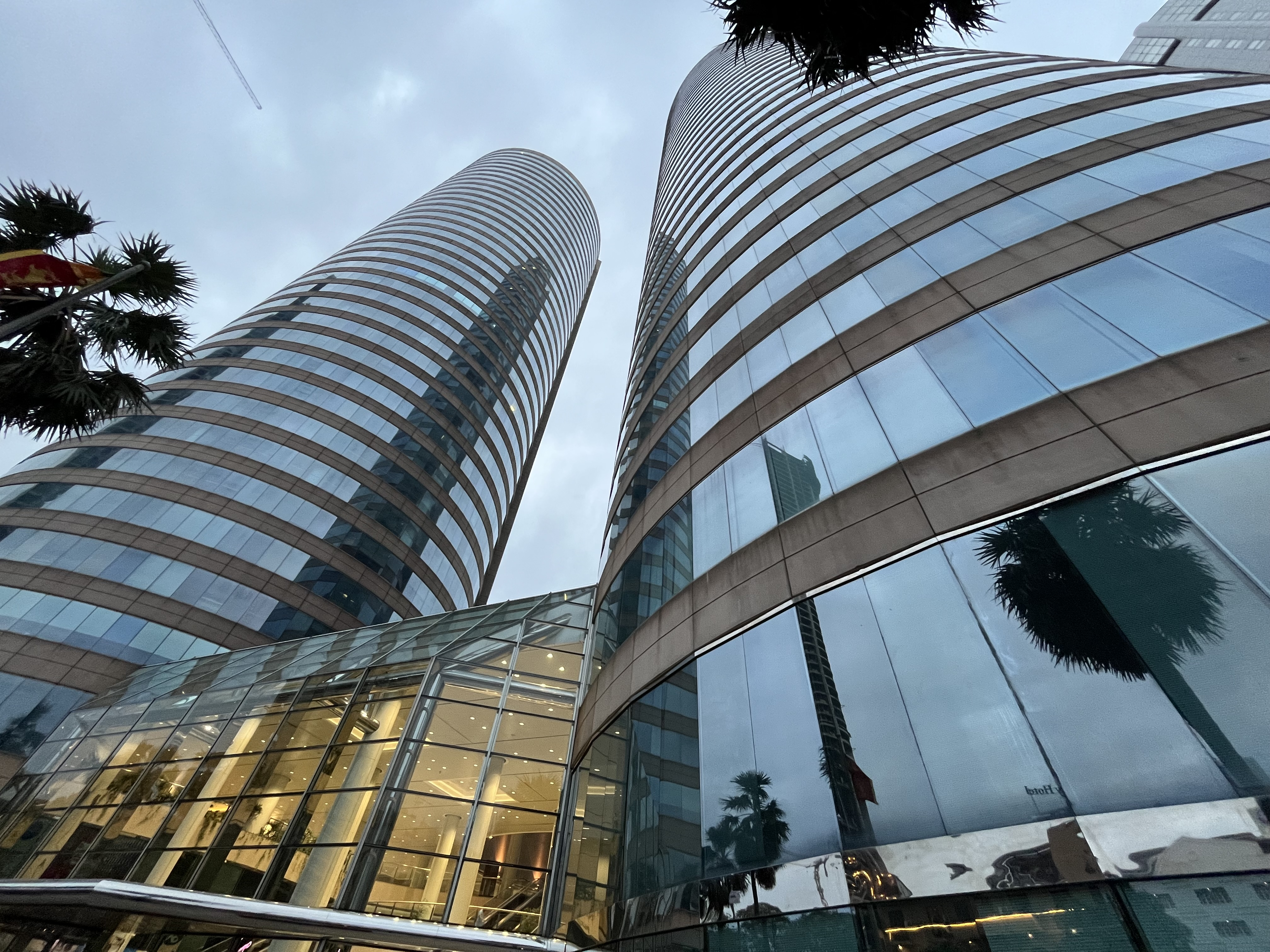

Agency overview
- Formed: 1992; 34 years ago
- Preceding agency: Greater Colombo Economic Commission
- Jurisdiction: Government of Sri Lanka
- Headquarters: Level 26, West Tower, World Trade Center, Colombo 1; 6.932650°N 79.843596°E
- Agency executives: Duminda Hulangamuwa, (Chairman); Renuka M. Weerakone, (Director General)
- Key document: Board of Investment of Sri Lanka Law, No. 4 of 1978
- Website: investsrilanka.com

The Board of Investment of Sri Lanka (BoI) (Sinhala: ශ්‍රී ලංකා ආයෝජන මණ්ඩලය Shri Lanka Ayojana Mandalaya) is the investment promotion agency of Sri Lanka. It was established in 1992, expanding the scope of the Greater Colombo Economic Commission (GCEC) which was formed in 1978. The legal framework for the BOI is governed by the Board of Investment Law, No. 4 of 1978, with key amendments made in 2009 and 2012.

== Export Processing Zones ==
The Board of Investment of Sri Lanka oversees several Export Processing Zones (EPZs) and Industrial Parks across the country, offering investors a range of facilities and tax incentives. Below is a list of key zones.

Zone	Location	Summary	Reference
Biyagama EPZ	Gampaha District	Located near Colombo and the Bandaranaike International Airport, this zone was established in 1985. It is the second-largest EPZ in Sri Lanka and houses various industries including textiles and electronics.	
Horana EPZ	Kalutara District	Established in 1999, the Horana EPZ focuses on low-polluting industries. It offers full infrastructure support, including power, water treatment, and telecom services.	
Kandy Industrial Park	Kandy District	Opened in 1994, this park covers 205 acres and supports industries in central Sri Lanka.	
Katunayake EPZ	Gampaha District	Established in 1978, Katunayake is Sri Lanka's first EPZ, located near the international airport, and is a key zone for garment manufacturing and other exports.	
Koggala EPZ	Galle District	This EPZ, established in 1991, focuses on industries such as garments and manufacturing, located in Southern Sri Lanka.	
Malwatta EPZ	Gampaha District	Located along the Colombo-Kandy highway, this zone was established in 1998 and covers 26 acres.	
Mawathagama EPZ	Kurunegala District	This EPZ, focused on low-polluting industries, was established in 1999 and covers 27 hectares.	
Mirigama EPZ	Gampaha District	Established in 1998, the Mirigama EPZ is designed for export-focused industries and covers 173 acres.	
Mirijjawila EPZ	Hambantota District	Located in Southern Sri Lanka, this EPZ was established to promote export-oriented industries, covering 22 acres.	
Seethawaka EPZ	Colombo District	Established as the only EPZ in the Colombo District, it accommodates a range of industries.	
Polgahawela EPZ	Kurunegala District	Opened in 2000, this EPZ is located along the Polgahawela-Kegalle highway.	
Wathupitiwela EPZ	Gampaha District	This EPZ, covering 123 acres, was established in 1998.	
Bingiriya EPZ	Kurunegala District	The largest EPZ, Bingiriya is set to become a major industrial hub with significant investments across multiple sectors. It is expected to generate over 75,000 jobs and drive export revenue exceeding USD 2.6 billion.	
