= Narahenpita =

Narahenpita නාරාහේන්පිට நாரஹென்பிட்டி
- Suburb
- Location within Greater Colombo Location within Colombo District Location within Sri Lanka
- Coordinates: 6°53′32″N 79°52′37″E
- Country: Sri Lanka
- Province: Western Province
- District: Colombo District
- Time zone: UTC+5:30 (Sri Lanka Standard Time Zone)
- Postal Code: 00500

Narahenpita is a municipal ward of Colombo, Sri Lanka. It is located at the southeastern corner of the city and served by the Kelani Valley Railway Line. Many government institutions, including the National Blood Bank, the Survey Department, the Labor Ministry, and several departments of the Health Ministry are situated in the area, as are several of the country's major private hospitals.

== Hospitals ==
Presently, Narahenpita has become the new hospital town and district. The main private hospitals are located here.

- Kings Hospital
- Asiri Hospital
- Asiri Surgical Hospital
- Lanka Hospital
- Ninewells Hospital
- Army Hospital
- Police Hospital
- Park Hospital
