= Dissanayake =

- Gender: Unisex
- Language: Sinhala

Other names
- Variant form: Dissanayaka

Dissanayake or Dissanayaka (Sinhala: දිසානායක, romanized: Disānāyaka; Tamil: திசாநாயக்க) is a Sinhalese surname. It means area leader.

Notable people with the surname include:

- Anura Kumara Dissanayake (born 1968), Tenth president of Sri Lanka
- Berty Premalal Dissanayake (1954–2013), Sri Lankan politician
- Cyril Dissanayake, Sri Lankan police officer
- Duminda Dissanayake (born 1979), Sri Lankan politician
- Ellen Dissanayake, American anthropologist
- Gamini Dissanayake (1942–1994), Sri Lankan politician
- Jayani Dissanayake, Sri Lankan politician
- Jayasena Dissanayake, Sri Lankan politician
- Kolitha Dissanayake, Sri Lankan cricketer
- Lalith Dissanayake, Sri Lankan politician
- Manjula Dissanayake (born 1967), Sri Lankan politician
- Mayantha Dissanayake (born 1980), Sri Lankan politician
- Navin Dissanayake (born 1969), Sri Lankan politician
- P. Weerakumara Dissanayake, Sri Lankan politician
- Rohana Dissanayake, Sri Lankan politician
- S. A. Dissanayake (1913–1982), Sri Lankan police officer
- S. B. Dissanayake (born 1951), Sri Lankan politician
- Salinda Dissanayake (born 1958), Sri Lankan politician
- Sarath Dissanayake (born 1961), Sri Lankan Navy officer
- Sarath Dissanayake, Sri Lankan judge of the Court of Appeal
- Somaratne Dissanayake, Sri Lankan film director, screenwriter and producer
- Sriyantha Dissanayake (born 1969), Sri Lankan sprinter
- T. B. Dissanayake, Sri Lankan lawyer
- T. D. S. A. Dissanayake, Sri Lankan diplomat and writer
- W. M. P. B. Dissanayake (1927–2003), Sri Lankan politician

== See also ==
- Dassanayake (disambiguation)
