= Tissanayagam family =

The Tissanayagam family(Mathakal), sometimes also spelled Tissainayagam, is a Jaffna Tamil family descended from Tissanayaka Mudali of Mannanpulam Mathakal. Tissanayaka Mudali (circa 1730) was a Tamil chieftain who lived during Dutch times (1658–1798).

The Tissanayagams are an ancient Jaffna Tamil family with extensive land holdings in and around the town of Mathakal on the northern coast of Jaffna, close to Keerimalai (where the famous hot springs are located). There is also a tradition in the area of Mathakal that it was the landing spot of Vijaya of Kalinga (ancient Orissa) when he and his followers first arrived in Sri Lanka around 543 BC. This story is given credence by the Mahavamsa which states that Vijaya and his followers kissed the soil as they landed on the island. The red loam where they knelt down turned their palms to a copper colour, as a result of which they names the island "Tambapani". Keerimalai is one of the places in Sri Lanka where copper-coloured soil (loam) is found close to the coast.

Ravimohan Surendranath Tissanayagam, the current patriarch of the Tissanayagam family, it would seem has the ability to claim royal descent both from his paternal ancestry as well as from maternal ancestry through the Kumarakulasingha family.

This article deals with the documentary evidence that is available with family as well as traditions that were passed down verbally as was the custom of the people of Northern Sri Lanka and India.

== Importance of the village of Mathakal ==
=== Introduction ===
The village of Mathakal lies on the coast road from Kankesanthurai to Karainagar, 16 kilometers from Jaffna. It was once a very prosperous and fertile village, often referred to in publications as the "prosperous and prestigious village of Mathakal" Today it is thought of as yet another sleepy fishing village of the Jaffna peninsula, for very few people know of its historical significance.

The Vaiya Padal, written in the 14th century by Vaiya the court poet of the Arya Chakravarthi's, which describes the colonization of the Jaffna peninsula states that Sethu Rayan of Kanjipuram and his retinue were the first settlers in Mathakal. The centre of the village is to this day referred to as Kanji and one of the lands of the village carry the thombu name "Sethu Rayan Kadu" corroborating the Vaiya Padal tradition.

=== Landing place of Prince Vijaya ===
The arrival of Prince Vijaya, the first Aryan colonist, with his 700 followers, around 543 BC is one of the most important events in the history of Sri Lanka. The fact whether this was a historical event or a story to illustrate that the first civilized colonists came from the North of India has still not been established. Many historians believe that Vijaya landed on the North Western coast of Sri Lanka, in the proximity of Mannar / Putlam. See Tambapanni.

This theory is now challenged by some serious students of history (refer research paper by D.G.A. Perera entitled "New Insights for Locating the ancient city of Thambapani" presented at the 11th conference of the International Association of Historians of Asia.)

According to the Yalpana Vaipava Malai which records the Tamil tradition, the landing of Vijaya took place on the Northern coast of Sri Lanka, at a spot in close proximity to Keerimalai There are two suggested derivations for "Thambapani" the ancient name for Lanka.

- According to the Mahavamsa, Prince Vijaya on reaching terra firma impetuously kissed the soil. As the soil in that area was red loam, his palms were stained a copper colour, and hence the name Thambapani which translates as copper coloured palms. Mudaliyar Rasanayagam in Ancient Jaffna states that nowhere else in Sri Lanka, can the red soil referred to in the legend be found in such close proximity to the sea, than in the area surrounding Keerimalai.
- The other suggested derivation for the name Thambapanni, makes the claim for Keerimalai or its proximity as the landing place of Prince Vijaya still stronger. The name is said to have been derived from two words: '"THAMBRA", which means good, and "PANNI", which means water. The fact that Keerimalai is celebrated for its fresh water springs and the additional fact that there in its vicinity are caves, where according to legend Kuveni hid Vijaya's companions, lends credence to this theory.

=== Identifying the ancient port of Jambukola ===
According to the Mahavamsa Sangamiththa their disembarked with her precious cargo, a branch of the Great Bodhi tree, under which Buddha had attained Nibbana at the ancient port of Jambukola which is today identified as the tiny haven of Sambilthurai on the periphery of the village of Mathakal.

The area near Mathakal in the Jaffna Peninsula is in the closest proximity to the mainland of India. From the dawn of history war-like invaders as well as peaceful immigrants have landed here from the mainland. In an article titled "Nagadipa & Buddhist remains in Jaffna" by Dr Paul E. Pieris published in the journal of the Royal Asiatic Society (Ceylon Branch) the distinguished scholar and historian says

"Its stands to reason that a country which is only 30 miles from India and which would have been seen by fisher men every morning as they sailed out to catch their fish would have been occupied as soon as the continent was peopled by men who understood how to sail. I suggest that the North of Ceylon was a flourishing settlement centuries before Vijaya was born"

When approaching the Jaffna Peninsula from the Indian coast it is said that three prominent headlands become visible to a sailor. They are Kovalam in Karaitivu, Jambu Kovalam near Mathakal, and Kal Kovalam in Point Pedro. Jambu Kovalam near Mathakal has become Jambukola in Pali, which is the language of the Mahavamsa. Father Gnanapragasar in his study of the Place Names of Jaffna has come to the conclusion that the term Mathakal is derived from the Sinhala word "Meda-gala" the middle or central head-land. This may be correct as it was mentioned earlier that Jambu Kovalam is the middle headland of the three kovalams, that are seen as one approaches the coast of Jaffna.

M. D. Ragavan in his book Tamil Culture in Ceylon while identifying Mathakal with the ancient sea port of Jambukola states as follows: "This port finds mention in Sinhalese chronicles as Jambukola, where landed the sacred Bo-tree sapling brought by Sangamitta. There is also the tradition that here was received a stone image of Parvati, reminiscent of which is its alternate name, Matha-kal, literally stone-mother, simplified into Mathakal."

Dr. P. Ragupathy is his book The Early Settlements of Jaffna also identifies Sambilthurai with "the famous port of Jambukola, mentioned in the Pali chronicles where Sangamittha landed with the saplings of the sacred Bo tree".

=== The Sacred Sri Maha Bodhi and Jambukola Vihara ===
The Mahavamsa account relates one of the miracles associated with the Sri Maha Bodhi, when the tree sprouted eight new shoots which grew into eight Bodhi saplings four hands high, in the presence of a large gathering of devotees. One of these saplings was planted where Sangamitta their disembarked. A land bearing the thombu name "Pothipulam" (land of the Bodhi) located on the coast of Mathakal, is identified by local legend as the point of disembarkation of Sangamiththa. This land is still owned by the Tissanayagam family. There used to exist on its precincts, an ancient Bo tree which was widely believed to be one of the original saplings. This tree and the old house called Pothipulam Valawu which had been taken over by the Sri Lanka Army, were both destroyed during the disturbances of 1983.

Devanampiyatissa is said to have erected a Vihara at the port of Jambukola called Jambukola Vihara and another; Tissa Maha Vihara in close proximity. Rasanayagam in his book Ancient Jaffna states that is his day, the ruins of a Dagaba and Vihara could still be seen close to the port, which could have been the site of Jambukola Vihara. He also suggests that a site about a 100 yards opposite the Paralay Kandasamy Temple at Chullipuram perhaps could mark the site of Tissa Maha Vihara. This area which was once known as Tissa Maluwa is now popularly called Tissamalai by the Tamils of the area. However, the map issued by the surveyor generals office still carries the old name.

In the recent past the Government of Sri Lanka has built a Dagaba and a Vihara and erected a statue of Sangamiththa in the proximity of Mathakal.

=== Tradition among the Kurukulams ===
There is a tradition in the Karawe community of Mathakal that the ships carrying Sangamiththa and her party were escorted from India to Jambukola were manned by them. This is mentioned in two publications: Tamils in Early Ceylon by C. Sivaratnam and the Story of the Jaffna Kurukulams by C. F. Nawaratne.

=== Mathakal and the Vaibava Malai ===
The village of Mathakal gets mentioned in the Vaibava Malai when it relates the last phase of the Kingdom of Jaffna under the Aryachakravarthi Kings. It states that the Portuguese rewarded Prince Paranirupasinghe for his loyalty, by giving him back the seven villages over which he was co-regent with Sankili Kumara, these villages were:

- Kalliyan-kadu
- Mallakam
- Sandiruppai
- Arali
- Achchuveli
- Uduppiddi
- Kachchai

To this they added the Capital City of Nallur and the village of Mathakal. One could perhaps understand why the Portuguese gave him Nallur since it was the capital of his dynasty. It is curious as to why the village of Mathakal was presented to him.

The Vaibava Malai also states that the Portuguese after the annexation of Jaffna, in their religious zeal destroyed all the Hindu temples in the Kingdom. It adds that in deference to Paranirupasinghe they did not destroy the great temple at Nallur nor those temples in the vicinity of Keerimalai. Tradition has it that the temples they spared were: the Mavittapuram Kandasamy temple, the Paralai Kandasami temple, and the temples of Mathakal including the Pillayar Kovil in Kanji. Once again one could understand why they spared Nallur the premier temple. However it is intriguing as to why they spared the temples in the vicinity of Keerimalai. It is not implausible to surmise that this area was of special significance to Paranirupasinghe.

The Aryachakravarthi's claimed that they originated from Sethu and their titles included the prefix "Sethupathi" meaning Lord of the Sethu and "Sethu Kavalan" which means Guardian of the Sethu. They used the word "Sethu" on their coins and as a form of greeting on their inscriptions. Sethu is the land that bordered both sides of the Palk Straits. If this definition is correct Mathakal too is a part of the "Sethu". Once again it is pertinent to note that the original inhabitant of Mathakal according to the Vaiya Padal was Sethu Rayan

The Vaibava Malai also states that Princess Vethavalli the only daughter of Paranirupasinghe was given in marriage to a Vellalar Chieftain of Mathakal. This legend acknowledges the high caste status of the Vellalar's of Mathakal. There is an old Tamil adage that says:

"When giving alms look ensure whether the bowl (the receiver) is deserving."

"When giving a daughter in marriage make sure of the pedigree (of the groom)"

It was always the custom of the Tamils to marry their daughters into a family of equal or higher caste status.

According to a tradition in the Tissanayagam family, their progenitor Tissanayake Mudali was descended from the Vellalar Chieftain who married princes Vethavalli. This is corroborated by the fact that the thombu name of the land where he resided was "Mannan Pulam" which means land of the King. Two of the lands held by the family also had connotations that it had once belonged to a Princess or Lady of high social status. The lands were: Alahiya Nachiyar Vayal the field of the beautiful princess, and Ammai Pangu the portion or dower of the matriarch.

=== Mylvagana Pulavar ===
Mylvaganam Pulavar who authored the Yalpana Vaibava Malai during Dutch times hailed from Mathakal. He claimed he was a direct descendant of Vaiya Puri Ayer the court port of the Arya Chakravarthi's, which would make the latter too an inhabitant of Mathakal. Yet another fact that connects the village to the Arya Chakravarthi Kings.

== Land holdings in the village of Mathakal ==
According to a tradition in the village of Mathakal, Tissanayake Mudaliyar who lived during Dutch times was descended from a Vellala Chieftain who had married a princess of Jaffna.

This mudaliyar lived in great state on a land which had the thombu name "Manan Pulam" which translates as the "land of the king".

Arrayed around "Manan Pulam" were lands with thombu names such as Kuthirai Kulipati (stables), Thannakkadi (elephant stables), Vannan kinathadi (settlement of washermen) Pallan Kulakkaral (settlement of Palla slaves) and Parrachi Tharai (land of the Paraya slaves), which showed that the service castes were settled around to attend to the needs of the Mudaliyar's family.

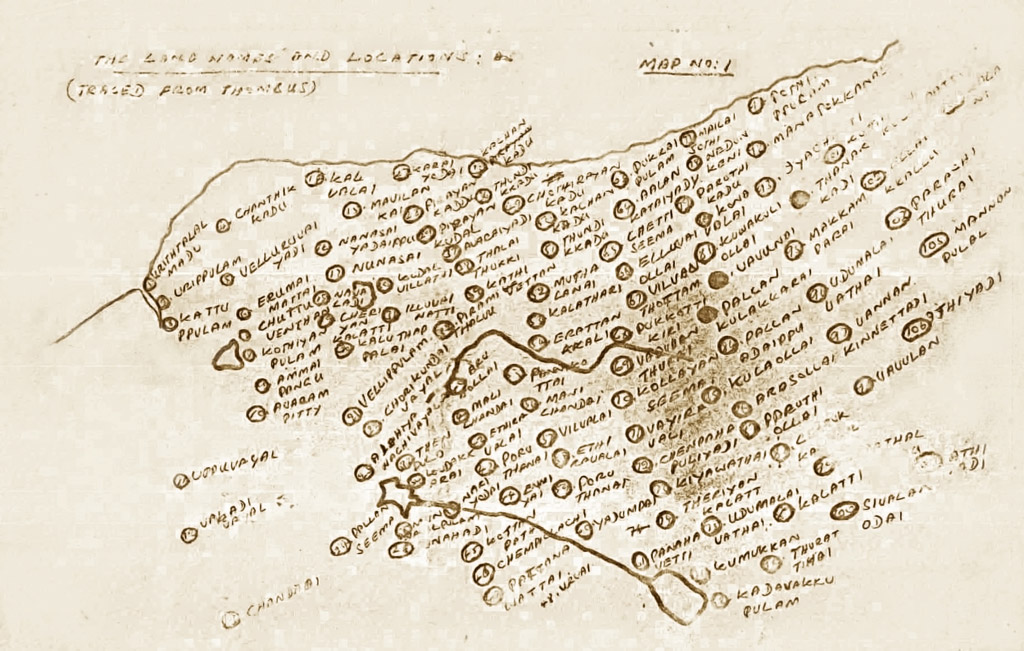

There were two other lands that belonged to the family which had connotations that they had once belonged to a lady of high social status. One such land was called "Ammai Pangu"( the portion of the dower of the matriarch), and the other was named "Alahiya Nachchiyar Vayal" ( the field of the beautiful princess).

The Thombu names of these lands substantiate the tradition that Tissanayaka Mudaliyar was of a royal lineage.

The Dutch thombus of Mathagal were registered only in 1820, during early British times. According to these records, the descendants of Tissanayaka Mudaliyar were among the largest landowners in Mathakal at that time. They are:

- Visvanathan Murugesar grandson 215 larchems
- Visvanathan Ambalavanar grandson 203 1/8 larchems
- Visvanathan Vaithianathan grandson 143 ¼ larchems

In the late 1880's, Murugesar Vaithianathan, the great-grandson of Tissanayaka Mudaliyar and the direct male ancestor of Mohan Tissanayagam, sold up most of his ancestral lands in Mathagal. At first he settled down at Clock Tower Road in the Grand Bazaar area. Later he purchased a large extent of land along what is known today as the Kandy Road, Chudikuli, adjoining St. John's College on one side and Old Park (the residence of the Government Agent of the Northern Province) on the other. He became acquainted with the Government Agent Sir William Crofton Twynam, who persuaded him to accept the position of Vidan of Jaffna Pattanam. His brother Ahilar Ambalavanar, held the office of the Vidan of Mathakal. It is pertinent to note that although the post of Vidan, was lower in the hierarchy of chieftains (below Maniagar, Udayar, and Arachchi) it was very important for the status of the holder of this office to be impeccable in order to be accepted by a cross section of society, right down to grass root levels A Vidan came in direct contact with citizens in discharging his duties. It as said that the prestige of Vidan Vaithianathan, was so great that his staff of office was sufficient to restore normalcy in a troubled area.

Visvanathar Murugesar, would have owned lands in many other villages as well. In a "samara kavi" (folk poem) he is referred to as "he who controls seven kernis" (irrigation tanks). What the poet tries to imply is that his land holdings were vast that seven migration tanks were necessary to irrigate them.

== Irumarapuntuuya - a title from the Dutch ==
Don Juan Kumarakulasinghe Mudaliyar was a prominent chieftain who lived during Dutch times. He was a large land owner and had extensive holdings in and around the village of Tellippalai. His seat was named "Mudi Valavu" which literally meant "Crown Manor".

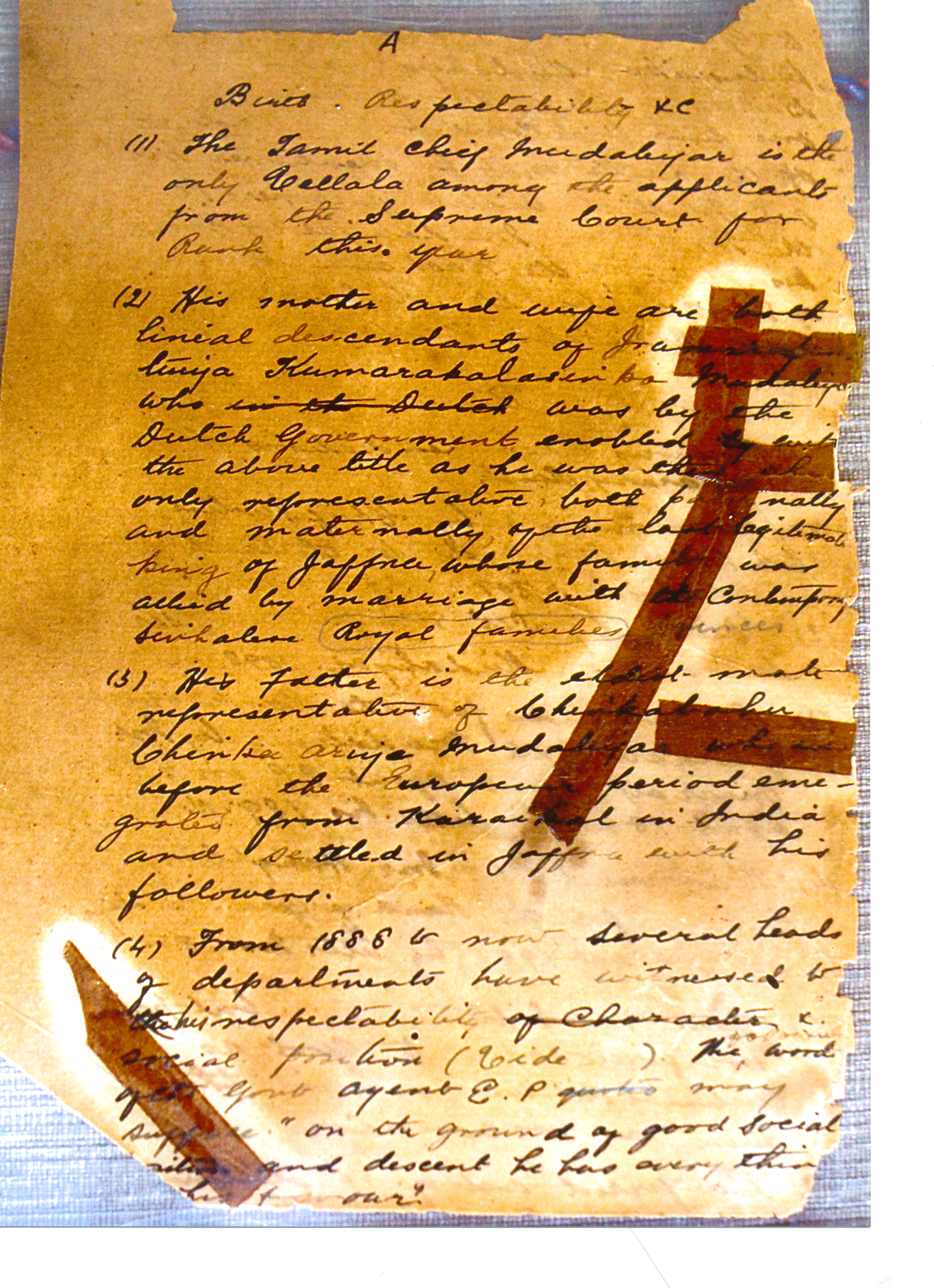
The Title of Irumarapuntuuya

The Portuguese period in Sri Lanka was one of social and religious turmoil. Some of the actions of the Portuguese not only disrupted time honoured traditions, but also the rigid social structure that had existed in Jaffna under its native rulers.

The missionary zeal of the Portuguese resulted in many conversions to Christianity, from Prince Paranirupasinghe the puppet king and his court, right down to humble peasants and fisher folk. Even Sankilli the usurper who was deposed by them for persecuting the new converts, had, according to tradition, received baptism prior to his execution.

The Dutch, who succeeded the Portuguese, in an attempt to rectify the damage done by the Portuguese, and thereby pacify the natives, introduced measures to recognize some of the old feudal families. In an attempt to re-establish the old order, they conferred the title of Irumarupuntuuya on Don Juan Kumarakulasinghe Mudaliyar in 1756 "in recognition of his position as the only representative, both through the paternal and maternal lines, of the last legitimate king of Jaffna, whose family was allied by marriage to the contemporary Singhalese dynasties".

A copy of this Dutch "Order in Council" reflecting this honour was available in the National archives, while another document by Percival Ackland Dyke is in family archives. The title Irumarapuntuuya in Tamil could be translated as: "Pure on both blood lines" which means that the recipient's paternal and maternal lineage are impeccable. This title was conferred on persons who were believed to have been of Royal descent.

There are many references to this Thomboo in various publications. Two of them are worth of note.

- The Golden Book of India and Ceylon by Sir Roper Lethbridge, published in 1900 has a reference to the late Gate Mudaliyar Kanaganayagam Charles Barr Kumarakulasinghe, a descendant of Don Juan Kumarakulasinghe, which reads as follows:

"Kanaganayagam Charles Barr Kumarakulasinghe Mudaliyar of the Governor’s Gate, born February 2nd 1862, belongs to the Kumarakulasinghe family of Jaffna. One of his ancestors received the title "Irumarupuntuyya Kumarakulasinghe Mudaliyar" from the Dutch Government in 1756, in recognition of his position as a direct descendant of the ancient kings of Jaffna."

- The other publication is The Chieftains of Ceylon by J. C. Van Sanden, published in 1936, which has a reference to Mudaliyar Richard Rasanayagam Barr Kumarakulasinghe, Maniagar Valigaman, another descendant, which states the following:

"held the office of Maniagar for 25 years, and on his retirement was made Justice of the Peace in recognition of his meritorious services. His father was a well known scholar and writer of Tamil verse and is mentioned in Arnold’s "Galaxy of Tamil Poets" The family is old and distinguished, tracing descent from an ancient Jaffna King, in acknowledgement of which social position, the Dutch Government in 1756 conferred on an ancestor of the Maniagar, the title of Irumarupuntuyya"

In the preface of the book the author categorically states the following:

"But I must also state that I have not permitted any persons to influence the facts-and opinions if any, in this publication. I have also had to contend against obstruction from a small coterie of Chief Headsman whose claims to aristocratic descent and distinguished antecedents I have not been prepared to concede. In this connection, my difficulty has been not so much as to how much to publish, but as to how much to leave out of a book which claims to be impartial and accurate"

The book is dedicated to King Edward the VIII, and the then Governor of Ceylon Sir Reginald Stubbs. The foreword is written by Sir Solomon Dias Bandaranaike, the Sinhala Mahamudliyar of the time.

It should be stressed that both these publications are authoritative works published in the heyday of the British Raj, and hence, whatever information contained therein could be accepted as reliable.

It was a period during which the socio-feudal structure of the country was almost intact and unlike present times no false claims would have gone unchallenged.

== Origin of the name ==
The name Tissanayagam or Tissainayagam is said to be an ancient title, the precise meaning of which is not very clear.

Tissai Nayagam in Tamil means the Sinhala title Dissanayake carried by the head of a Dissawani or Province.

Tissanayagam means the Nayakka or Chief of the Tissa clan, a clan claiming descent from Kalinga. According to the Vaibava Malai, Ugrasingha of Kalinga a descendant of King Vijaya's brother, boldly carried away princess Maruthap-pira-vika-villi as he was struck by her beauty. The princess was in the process of building a temple at Maviddapuram with the help of her father Thisai Yukkra Chola. Ugra singhe and Maruthap-pira-vika-villi founded the Kalinga line of Jaffna., "Ragavan states that the dynasty founded by Uggirasinhan steadily evolved in time into the dynasty of the Aryachakravarthis."

Tissanayake Mudali's son Visvanathan was the Udayar of Maviddapuram. A document where he has signed as a witness to a marriage that took place in 1791 is available in the family archives.

Maviddapuram was the seat of Hindu Orthodoxy and its temple perhaps one of the oldest and most revered temples of the peninsula. Referred to as the temple of the 7 pagodas' it was destroyed by the Portuguese in the 1770s. To have been the Udayar of Maviddapuram, Tissanayake Mudaliyar Visvanathan would have been of an exceptionally high caste.

According to tradition the Arya Chakravarthi's who came to Jaffna in the 13th century, married into the old Kalinga line "Ganga Kula" of Jaffna to gain legitimacy and acceptance. It was for this reason perhaps that the Arya Chakravarthi's who were originally of the "Arya kula" styled themselves "Gangei Arya".

According to family tradition, "Tissayan" or "Ticaiyan" was a title every male member of the clan carried as a prefix to his name. The Sinhala equivalent of this title was "Tissaya". The family took great pride in this title as an important part of their heritage.

During the wedding ceremony of a male member of the clan, the officiating priest would always use the prefix Tissayan to the names of the groom and his ascendants when reciting the "gothra" (pedigree)

In the 1950s Mr. M. J. Tissanayagam, when he was on the editorial staff of the Ceylon Daily News, assumed the pen name Tissayan, when writing his column.

The actual significance of this name is not clear, however the following information may be of relevance.

- Paranawithana in his introduction to the "Inscriptions of Ceylon" states under a section captioned "Royal Titles" that Tissaya was a name made up of two words; Tissa and Aya. He goes on to state that the sons of kings were referred to with the title "Aya". The use of the word in connection with Royal Princes is paralleled by that of "Kumara" which has the meaning of child. He also explains that "Daraka" was another title for a Prince which once again in Sanskrit and Pali means Daru or child. Giving reasons he comes to the conclusion that unlike a Prince with the title Aya who could transmit his Royal status to his descendants a Prince with the title "Daraka"was not in a position to do so.
- Ragupathi in his book "Early Settlements of Jaffna", covers the area called Ticai Maluvai (Tissa Maluwa of the Mahavamsa) near Mathakal, and in his footnotes refers to Ticayan as an ancient clan name Incidentally Mathakal is the village from where the family originates.

The grant of Nallamapaanan the Vaniar of Pannankaman, made in Dutch times appoints Kantha Udayar of Vilankulam as mudaliyar of Kilakumulai. On his appointment Kantha Udayan, an ancestor of the family, who was awarded many privileges, takes the name off "Ticai Vilangu Nayake Mudali".

Vilam Kulam is a Tamil word which means "pond of the wood-apple tree", and has been corrupted to Bulankulame in Sinhala.

Incidentally the Bulankulame family are the lay custodians of the scared "Sri Maha bodhi". According to Tissanayagam family tradition not only did Sangamiththa disembark at Pothipulam, which was a land owned by them, but the family also formed marriage alliances with the families that arrived with the sacred Sri Maha Bodhi, and who were settled in the North Central Province of Sri Lanka
