= Ministry of Education Services =

Agency overview
- Formed: 28 January 2013; 13 years ago
- Jurisdiction: Sri Lanka
- Employees: 72
- Annual budget: Rs 7.684,650 Billion
- Minister responsible: Vacant

The Ministry of Education Services is the Sri Lankan government ministry. Duminda Dissanayake is the only individual who has ever served as the minister responsible for this ministry.

== List of ministers ==
The Minister of Education Services is an appointment in the Cabinet of Sri Lanka.

Parties

Sri Lanka Freedom Party United National Party

Name	Portrait	Party	Tenure	President
Duminda Dissanayake		Sri Lanka Freedom Party	28 January 2013–12 January 2015	Mahinda Rajapaksa

== See also ==
- List of ministries of Sri Lanka
