= Saddanathar Sivan Kovil =

Hindu temple in Nallur, Sri Lanka

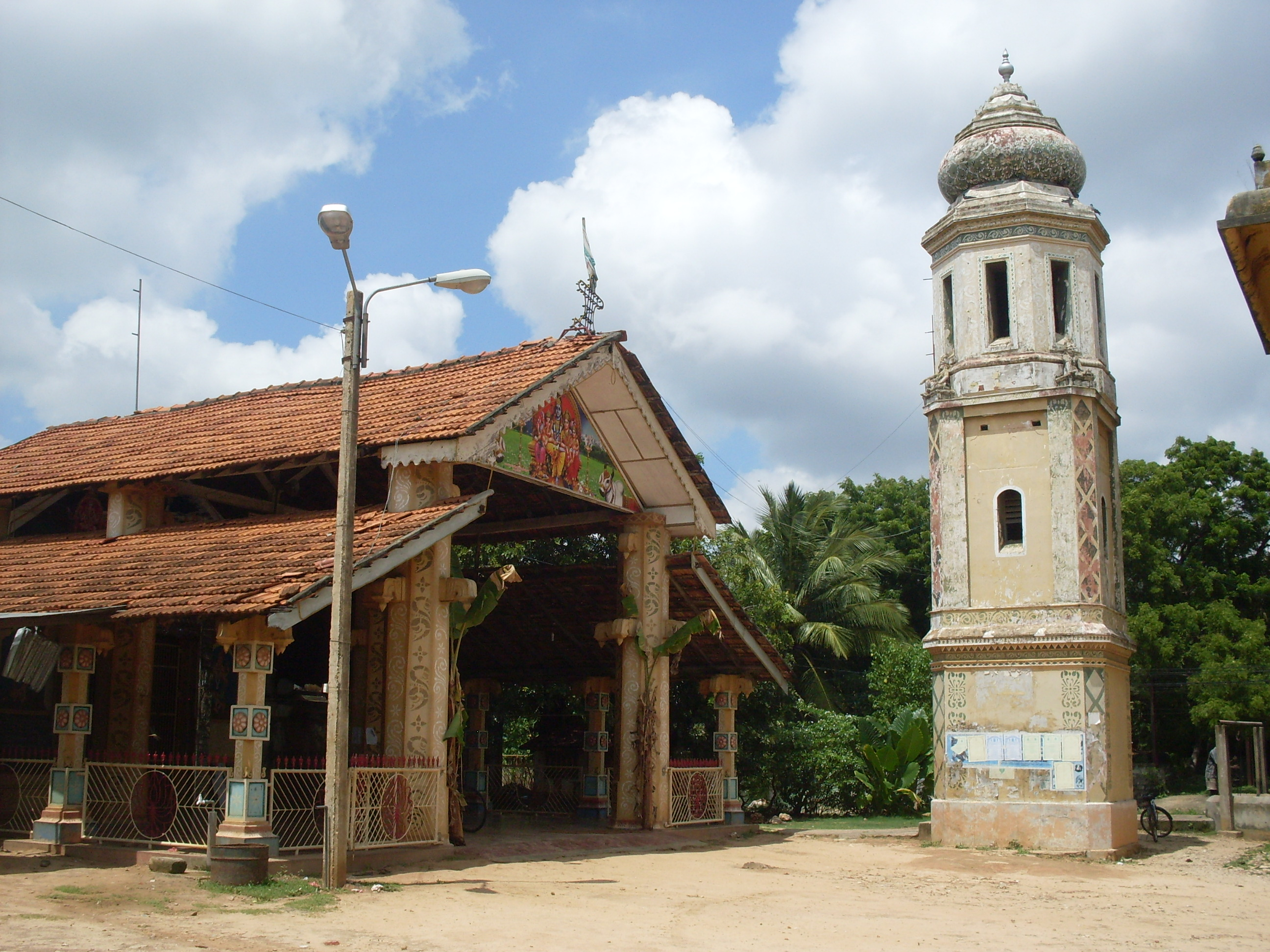

Saddanathar Sivan Kovil is a Hindu Temple and located in Nallur, Jaffna, Sri Lanka. This is an ancient temple and built in Sangiliyan Kingdom.
