= List of chief ministers of North Central Province =

Chief Minister of North Central Province
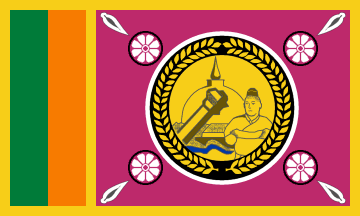
- Flag of North Central Province, Sri Lanka
- Incumbent; Vacant Under Governor's Rule since 1 October 2017
- Board of Ministers of the North Central Province
- Style: The Honourable
- Member of: North Central Provincial Council
- Appointer: P. B. Dissanayake
- Inaugural holder: G. D. Mahindasoma
- Formation: 3 February 1988
- Website: North Central Provincial Council

The chief minister of North Central Province, Sri Lanka is the head of the provincial board of ministers, a body which aids and advises the governor, the head of the provincial government, in the exercise of his executive power. The governor appoints as chief minister the member of the North Central Provincial Council who, in his opinion, commands the support of a majority of that council.

== Chief ministers ==
Sri Lanka Freedom Party United National Party

No.	Name	Portrait	Party	Took office	Left office	Refs
1	G. D. Mahindasoma		United National Party	8 May 1988	2 May 1996	
2	Jayasena Dissanayake		United National Party	2 May 1996	June 1998	
	Vacant			June 1998	April 1999	
3	Jayani Dissanayake		Sri Lanka Freedom Party	15 April 1999	June 1999	
4	Berty Premalal Dissanayake		Sri Lanka Freedom Party	June 1999	24 September 2012	
5	S. M. Ranjith		Sri Lanka Freedom Party	24 September 2012	28 January 2015	
6	Peshala Jayarathne		Sri Lanka Freedom Party	28 January 2015	1 October 2017	
	Vacant			1 October 2017		
