= Dassanayake =

Dassanayake දසනායක
- Pronunciation: Dasanāyaka
- Language: Sinhala

Origin
- Region of origin: Sri Lanka

Other names
- Alternative spelling: Dassanaike

Dassanayake or Dassanaike (Sinhala: දසනායක, romanized: Dasanāyaka) is a Sinhalese surname.

== Notable people ==
- Ananda Dassanayake (1920–2012), Sri Lankan politician
- Chamara Sampath Dassanayake, Sri Lankan politician
- D. M. Dassanayake (1953–2008), Sri Lankan politician
- Dharmasiri Dassanayake, Sri Lankan politician
- Duminda Dassanayake (born 1988), Sri Lankan cricketer
- Gehan Dassanayake, Sri Lankan cricketer
- Indra Dassanayake (1943–2019), Sri Lankan academic
- Ivan Dassanayake (1910-?), Ceylonese politician
- Kingsley C. Dassanaike (1914–?), Ceylonese scout leader
- Pubudu Dassanayake (born 1970), Sri Lankan cricketer
- Sarath Dassanayake (1942–1999), Sri Lankan composer
- Sarinda Dassanayake (born 1995), Sri Lankan cricketer
- Tudor Dassanayake (died 2006), Sri Lankan civil servant

== See also ==
- Dissanayake (disambiguation)
