= St. James' Church, Nallur =

St. James' Church
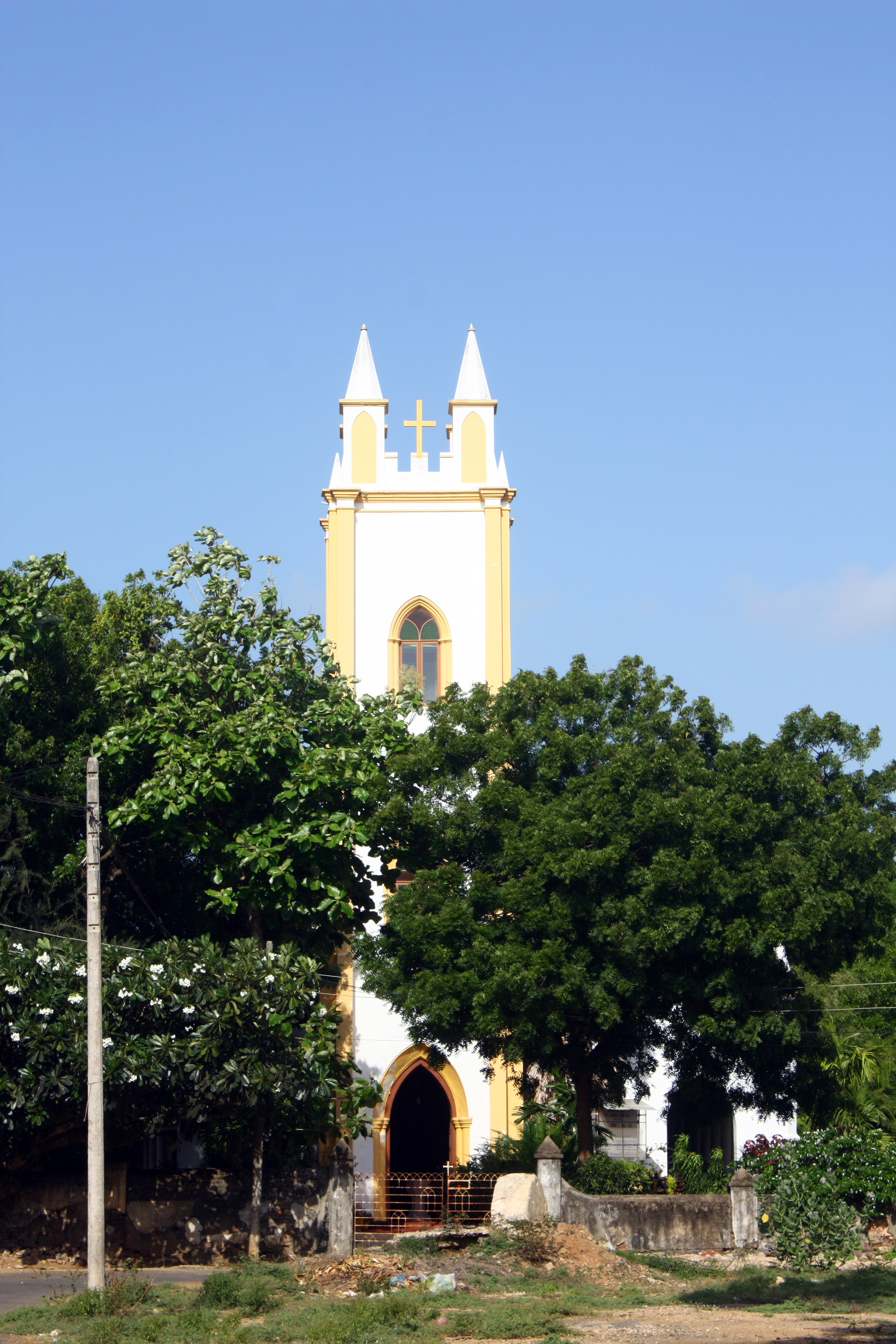

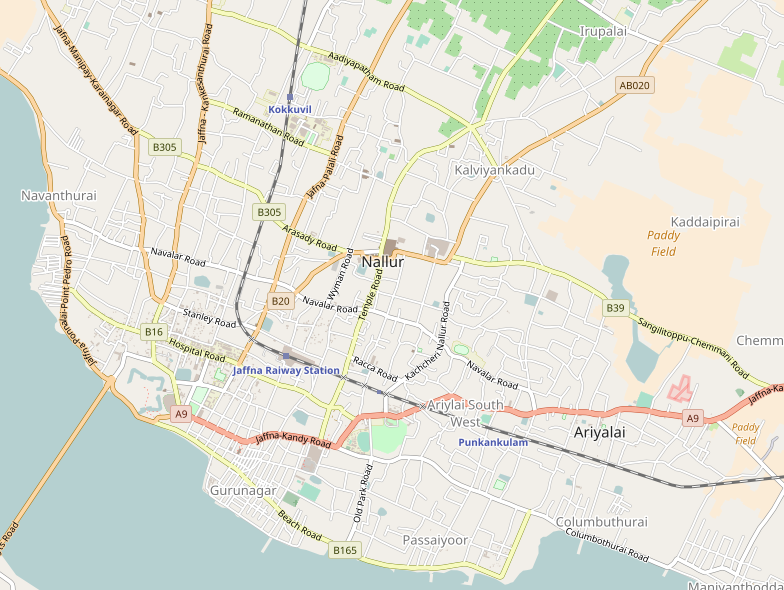
- Location in greater Jaffna
- 09°40′24.80″N 80°02′15.60″E
- Location: Nallur
- Country: Sri Lanka
- Denomination: Anglican

History
- Status: Church
- Consecrated: 1847

Architecture
- Functional status: Active
- Heritage designation: Archaeological protected monument
- Designated: 30 December 2011
- Completed: 1828

Administration
- Metropolis: Archbishop of Canterbury
- Diocese: Colombo

Clergy
- Vicar: S. D. P. Selvan

St. James' Church is a Church of Ceylon church located in Nallur in northern Sri Lanka.

== History ==
In 1817 the Anglican Church Mission Society (CMS) approved the establishment of missions in Ceylon. On 20 December 1817 four clergymen - Joseph Knight, Samuel Lambrick, Robert Major and Benjamin Ward - and their wives left England and sailed to Ceylon on board the Vittoria. They arrived in late June 1818. Knight went to Jaffna, Lambrick went to Colombo, Major and his wife went to Galle and Ward and his wife to Trincomalee. Knight started his missionary work in 1818 in Nallur. In 1820 Knight bought a mission house in Nallur to conduct regular services. An old, dilapidated Dutch church next to the mission house was handed over to the mission by the government in 1823. This church was the site of the Nallur Kandaswamy Temple before it was destroyed by the Portuguese. Part of the original Shivalingam of the Nallur Kandaswamy Temple was located in the Vicarage until 1995 when it was destroyed during the recapture of Jaffna by Sri Lanka armed forces and the platform where the shivalingam was mounted on can still be seen in the hallway of the vicarage. After extensive repairs this church was opened to the public for worship on 25 July 1828 (St. James' day). Bishop James Chapman consecrated the church in 1847 and in 1849 a 60 feet tower was added.

The church was declared an archaeological protected monument in December 2011.
