= Nallur Kandaswamy temple =

Hindu temple in Nallur, Sri Lanka

Nallur Kandaswamy Temple
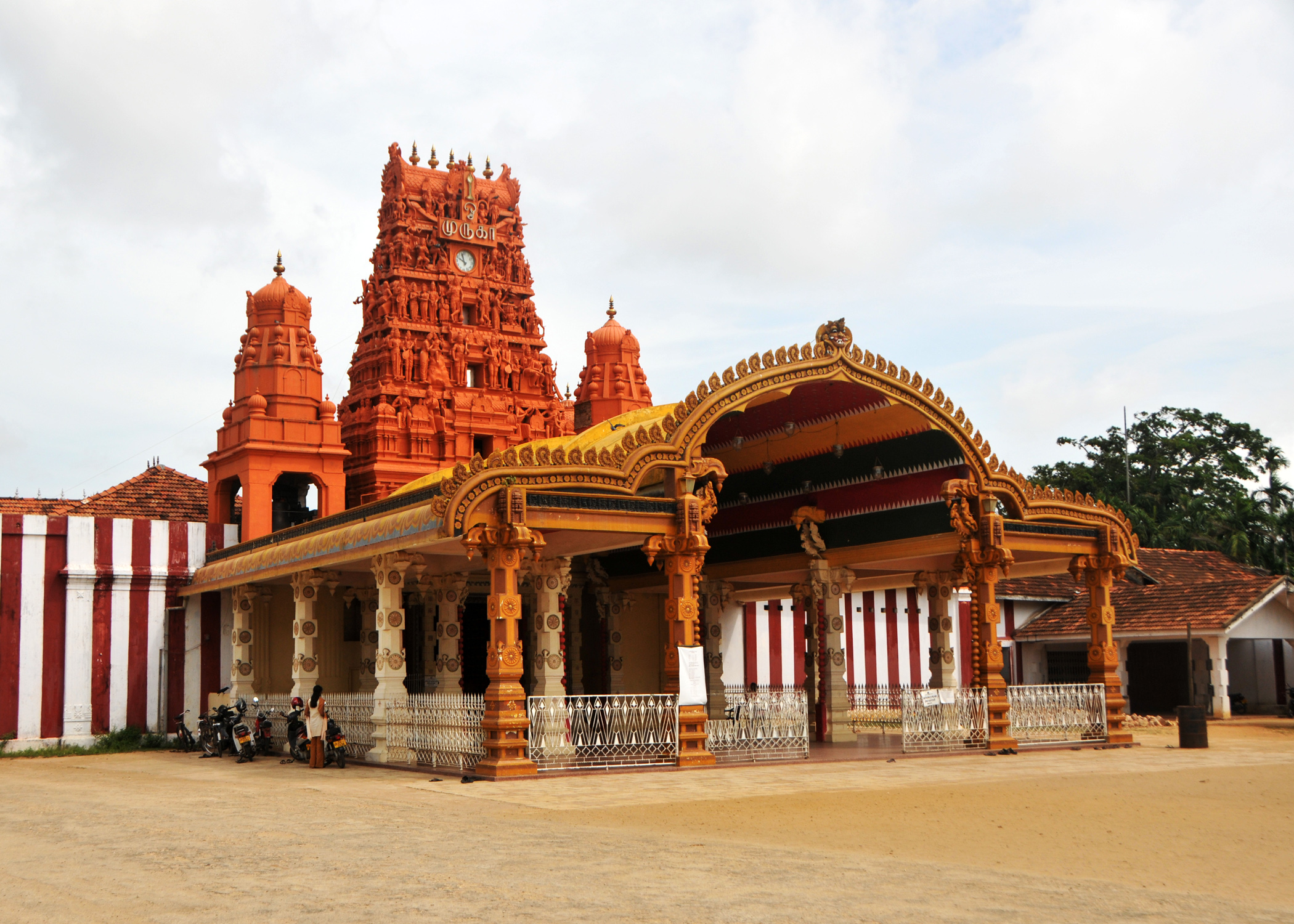
- Entrance to the Nallur Kandaswamy Kovil in Jaffna, Sri Lanka.

- Location in Sri Lanka

Religion
- Affiliation: Hinduism
- District: Jaffna District
- Province: Northern
- Deity: Murugan

Location
- Location: Nallur
- Country: Sri Lanka
- Interactive map of Nallur Kandaswamy Temple
- Coordinates: 9.6745°N 80.0293°E

Architecture
- Type: Tamil architecture
- Creator: 'Don Juan' Ragunatha Maapaana Mudaliyar
- Completed: Founded in 948 AD reconstructed in 1734.
- Elevation: 8.42 m (28 ft)

Website
- http://nallurkanthan.com/

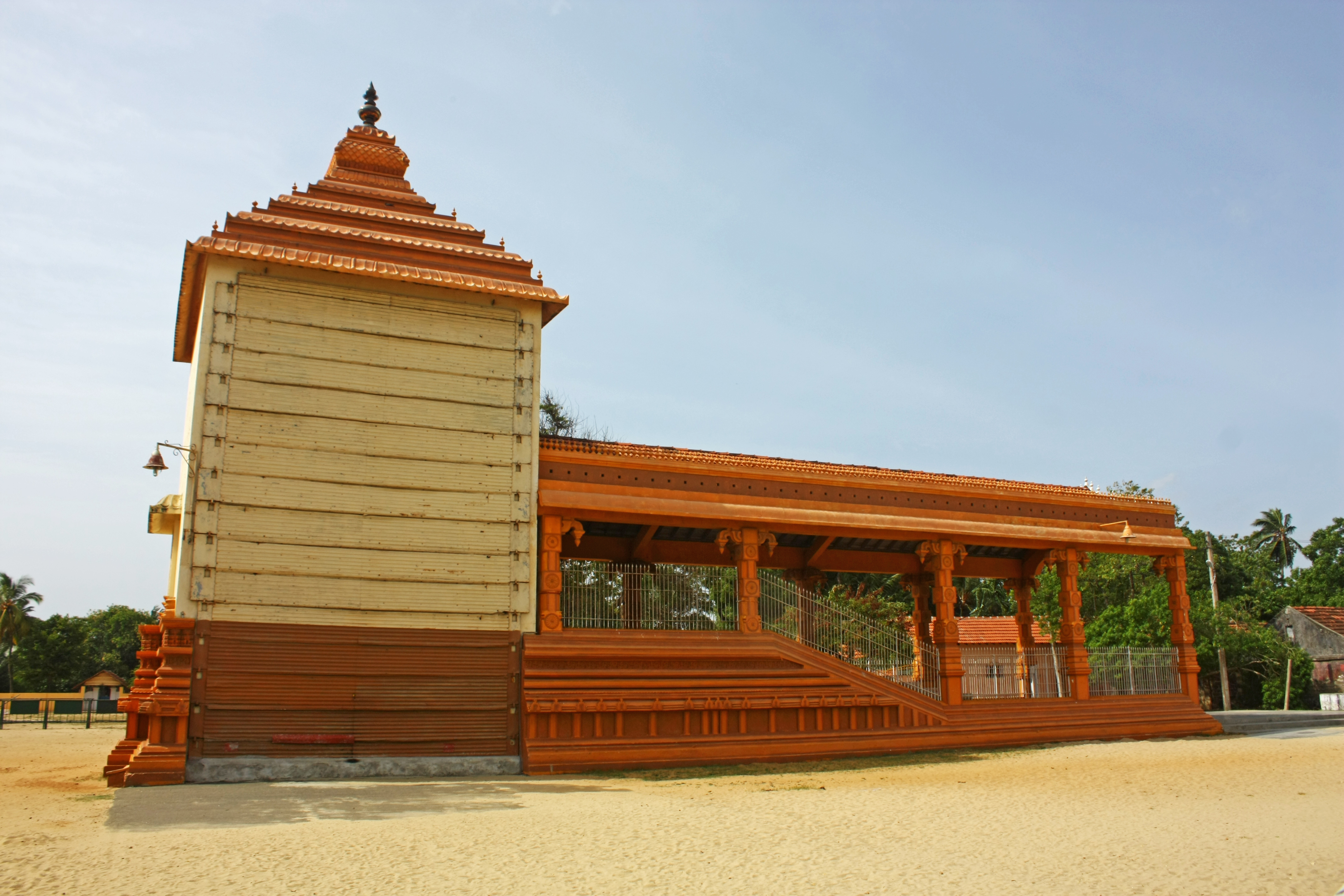
House of temple chariot, where the chariot is stored when it is not being used to transport deity statues on festival days

The Nallur Kandaswamy Kovil (Tamil: நல்லூர் கந்தசுவாமி கோவில், romanized: Nallūr kantacuvāmi kōvil Sinhala: නල්ලුරුව ස්කන්ධ කුමාර කෝවිල, romanized: nalluruva skandha kumāra kōvila) is a Hindu temple, located in Nallur, Northern Province, Sri Lanka. The presiding deity is Murugan (Kartikeya) in the form of the divine spear vel in the sanctum, the primary shrine, and in other forms, namely, Shanmugar, Muthukumaraswami, Valli Kanthar with consorts Valli and Deivayanai, and Dandayuddhapani, sans consorts in secondary shrines in the temple.

== Origins – The earlier shrines of Kandaswamy in Nallur ==
The original, Kandaswamy Temple was founded in 948 CE. According to the Yalpana Vaipava Malai, the temple was developed at the site 13th century by Puvenaya Vaku, a Minister to the Jaffna King Kalinga Magha. Sapumal Kumaraya (also known as செண்பகப் பெருமாள், Ceṇpakap Perumāḷ in Tamil) an adopted son of Parakramabahu VI, who ruled the Jaffna kingdom on behalf of the Kotte kingdom is credited with building the third Nallur Kandaswamy temple. Nallur served as the capital of the Jaffna kings, with the royal palace situated very close to the temple. Nallur was built with four entrances with gates. There were two main roadways and four temples at the four gateways.

The present rebuilt temple that exists now does not match their original locations which instead are occupied by churches erected by the Portuguese. The center of the city was Muthirai Santhai (market place) and was surrounded by a square fortification around it. There were courtly buildings for the kings, Brahmin priests, soldiers, and other service providers. The old Kandaswamy temple functioned as a defensive fort with high walls. In general, the city was laid out like the traditional temple town according to Hindu traditions. Cankilian Thoppu, the facade of the palace of King Cankili II, can still be found in Nallur. The third temple was destroyed by the Portuguese conqueror of the Jaffna Kingdom Filipe de Oliveira in 1624 CE. The original kovil was located where St. James' Church, Nallur is located today. Part of the original Shivalingam of the Nallur Kandaswamy Temple was located in the Vicarage till 1995 when it was destroyed during the recapture of Jaffna by Sri Lanka armed forces and the platform where the shiva lingam was mounted on can still be seen in the hallway of the vicarage.

== Present Temple ==
The fourth and the present temple was constructed in 1734 CE during Dutch colonial era by 'Don Juan' Ragunatha Maapaana Mudaliyar, who served as a Shroff in the Dutch Katchery, in a place identified then as the 'Kurukkal Valavu. Krishnaiyar, a Brahmin, served as the first priest of the temple.

Initially, the temple was built using bricks and stones and had a cadjan roof, enshrining a 'vel' in the middle. The original shrine had only two small halls.

Ragunatha Maapaana Mudaliyar's descendants continued to administer the temple as custodians of the temple over the past centuries and to date many additions have been made.

The start of the 'Golden Period' in the history of Nallur Temple is recorded as post-1890, soon after the taking over the temple administration by Arumuga Maapaana Mudaliyar, the 7th Custodian. The first Bell tower was erected by him in 1899 and he made many improvements to the temple including the main Sanctum, renovating it using granite to pave the floor of the Sanctum in 1902. The first enclosing wall was erected in 1909 by him. Likewise, the temple has been gradually renovated from time to time by its successors to date. In 1964, the 10th Custodian, Kumaradas Maapaana Mudaliyar, assumed office and served until his death in 2021 at the age of 92. During his long custodianship, he spearheaded extensive renovations and expansions that virtually rebuilt the entire temple complex, transforming Nallur Kandaswamy Temple into the largest Hindu temple complex in Sri Lanka. The custom of the annual 'Thiruppani', introduced by him, has seen the temple growing into its present splendor. Today the temple has four Gopurams and six Bell Towers, along with its fortified walls, giving it an appearance of a citadel in Nallur. The present administrator, is the 11th Custodian, Kumaresh Shayanthana Kumaradas Maapaana Mudaliyar, who took over the temple in 2021.

The temple has the main entrance facing the east. It has an ornately carved five-story tower or gopuram in the Dravidian architecture style at the main entrance.

Muthukumarasarma Vaikunthavasan has been the chief priest there since 2009, pioneering the Annual Festival for over 17 years.

In the surrounding inner very or circumambulatory path, it has shrines for the deities Ganesha, Palliyarai, Sandana Gopalar, Gajavalli Mahavalli, Vairavar, and Surya with his consorts, and Vairavar.

There is also shrine for Shivalingam and Parvati

In the southern part of this temple, the holy pond and Thandayudhapaani shrine can be seen. On the northern side, one finds the 'Poonthottam' the holy garden.

== Social significance ==
The temple is a socially important institution for the Sri Lankan Tamils Tamil identity of the north Sri Lanka. In the Sri Lankan Tamil diaspora, many temples have been built in Europe and North America using the same name as Tamil cultural memory.

== New Raja Gopuram Additions ==
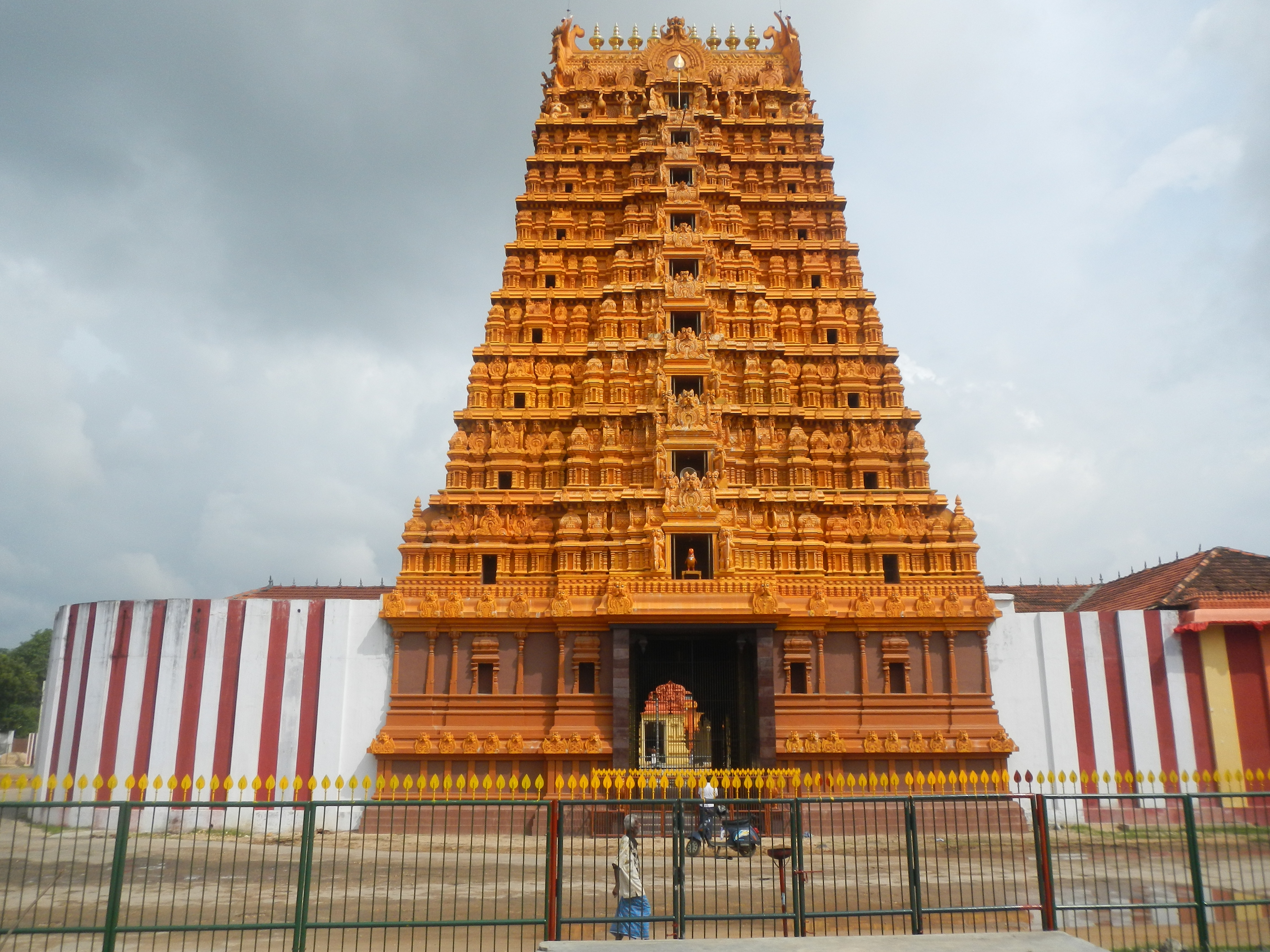
Newly built gopuram at the southern side

On 21 August 2011, the temple unveiled its new Nine-storey Raja Gopuram, Named 'Shanmuha Raja Gopuram' with an entrance called 'Swarna Vaasal' (The Golden Entrance) at 7:00 am local time.

Another New Raja Gopuram was unveiled on 4 September 2015 at 7:00 a.m. local time, creating a new Northern entrance to the temple complex. It is known as 'Gubera Raja Gopuram', and the entrance is named 'Kubera Vaasal'. This tower slightly overpowers the Southern tower and to date recorded as the biggest Gopuram on the island. 'Guberan' is the deity for wealth and he protects the Northern direction. It is believed by the local people that this Gopuram will attract more wealth to the people of the Jaffna peninsula.

== Festivals ==
The temple hosts the annual festival which begins with the hoisting of the Holy flag – the Kodiyetram. The cloth for hoisting is ceremonially brought to the temple in a small chariot from a family belonging to the Sengunthar Kaikola Mudaliyar dynasty, for centuries.

The festival is spread over a period of twenty-five days during which various Yāgams Abishekams and special poojas are conducted. The major religious festivals people flock to witness are the Manjam, Thirukkarthikai, Kailasavahanam, Velvimanam, Thandayuthepani it's a being, Sapparam, Ther festival procession, Theertham – the water cutting festival, and Thirukalyanam – The holy wedding. The Ther Thiruvila (chariot festival) is the most popular of all events is very colorful and commences at 6:15 am. The glamorously dressed Murugan and his consorts are carried out on a silver throne called the simhasanam, an intricately carved masterpiece created by the 7th Custodian, Arumuga Maapaana Mudaliyar in the year 1900.

The huge and heavy chariot carrying the statue of the deity Murugan and consorts is paraded along the streets of the temple.

== See also ==
- Northern Province, Sri Lanka
- Hinduism in Sri Lanka
- Arumuka Navalar
- Murugan
