= Jayani Dissanayake =

Sri Lankan politician

3rd Chief Minister of North Central Province
- In office 15 April 1999 – June 1999
- Preceded by: Jayasena Dissanayake
- Succeeded by: Berty Premalal Dissanayake

Personal details
- Party: Sri Lanka Freedom Party
- Other political affiliations: People's Alliance
- Spouse: Berty Premalal Dissanayake
- Children: 4 Sons, including Duminda Dissanayake
- Profession: Teacher

Jayani Tissera Dissanayake was the 3rd Chief Minister of North Central Province. She was appointed on 15 April 1999 succeeding Jayasena Dissanayake and was Chief Minister until June 1999. She was succeeded by her husband Berty Premalal Dissanayake.

Dissanayake is a trained teacher of Mathematics. Her husband is Berty Premalal Dissanayake whom she has 4 Sons with, including Duminda Dissanayake.

Political offices
Preceded by Jayasena Dissanayake	Chief Minister of North Central Province; 1999	Succeeded by Berty Premalal Dissanayake
