= Bulankulame =

Bulankulame is a surname. Notable people with the surname include:

- Dhamika Bulankulame (born 1965), Sri Lankan cricketer
- P. B. Bulankulame (1890–1958), Ceylonese politician
