= Peshala Jayarathne =

Sri Lankan politician

6th Chief Minister of North Central Province
- In office 28 January 2015 – 1 October 2017
- Preceded by: S. M. Ranjith
- Succeeded by: Vacant

Sudasinghe Mudiyanselage Peshala Jayarathne Bandara is a Sri Lankan politician and is the former Chief Minister of the North Central Province of Sri Lanka.
