= Berty Premalal Dissanayake =

Sri Lankan politician (1954–2013)

Hon. Berty Premalal Dissanayake

4th Chief Minister of North Central Province
- In office June 1999 – 2012
- Preceded by: Jayani Dissanayake
- Succeeded by: S. M. Ranjith

Minister of Social Services
- In office 1994–1999
- President: Chandrika Kumaratunga

Member of Parliament for Anuradhapura
- In office 1989–1999

Personal details
- Born: July 15, 1954 Anuradhapura
- Died: September 27, 2013 (aged 59) Colombo
- Party: Sri Lanka Freedom Party
- Other political affiliations: People's Alliance
- Spouse: Jayani Dissanayake
- Children: Four sons, including Duminda Dissanayake

Berty Premalal Dissanayake (15 July 1954 – 27 September 2013) was a Sri Lankan politician, who served as the member of parliament for Anuradhapura from 1989 to 1999, the Minister of Social Services between 1994 and 1999, and Chief Minister of the North Central Province from June 1999 to 2012. He was a member of the Sri Lanka Freedom Party and part of the United People's Freedom Alliance.

== Early life ==
Berty Premalal Dissanayake was born on 15 July 1954 in Anuradhapura, the eldest child in a family of four, to Ranbanda and Nandawathi Manike Dissanayake. He was educated at Hathareswela Vidyalaya; Anuradhapura Madha Maha Vidyalaya, Anuradhapura; and Alexandra College, Colombo. He studied science at university before entering into active politics in 1977 under the guidance of Kekirawa SLFP councillor, A. M. Jinadasa.

== Political career ==
During a difficult political period, Dissanayake played a key role in reviving the Sri Lanka Freedom Party (SLFP) and was eventually appointed as the co-organiser of Kalawewa constituency by SLFP Leader Sirimavo Bandaranaike. He was instrumental in several political victories, including the 1988 provincial council election and the 1989 general election, where he was elected as a member of parliament representing the Anuradhapura Electoral District.

Dissanayake was also a significant figure in the development of the SLFP, serving as the District party leader by 1994. He was awarded the post of Deputy Minister of Industrial Development and later served as the Minister of Social Services, in the Kumaratunga cabinet.

When establishing the Rajarata Medical College, required the creation of a teaching hospital, Dissanayake mediated it and assigned the Anuradhapura General Hospital to the central government. He also supported transforming the Sri Lanka Institute of Advanced Technology into a Technical college.

Despite facing opposition from within his political party for expressing his own ideologies, Dissanayake was known as a strong figure who challenged the prevailing reactionary hegemony in the North Central and advocated for socialist ideals. During the 2005 presidential election, he actively worked to support Mahinda Rajapaksa's victory, with some organisational efforts in the North Central, Vavuniya, and Trincomalee areas.

== Personal life ==
He married Bhada Jayani Tissera and they had four sons, Duminda, who is currently an MP for Anuradhapura and a former Minister, Kavinda Ravinda Dissanayake, and Amila Eranda.

Dissanayake died on 27 September 2013.
