= Nallur, Jaffna =

Nallur நல்லூர் නල්ලූර්
- Town
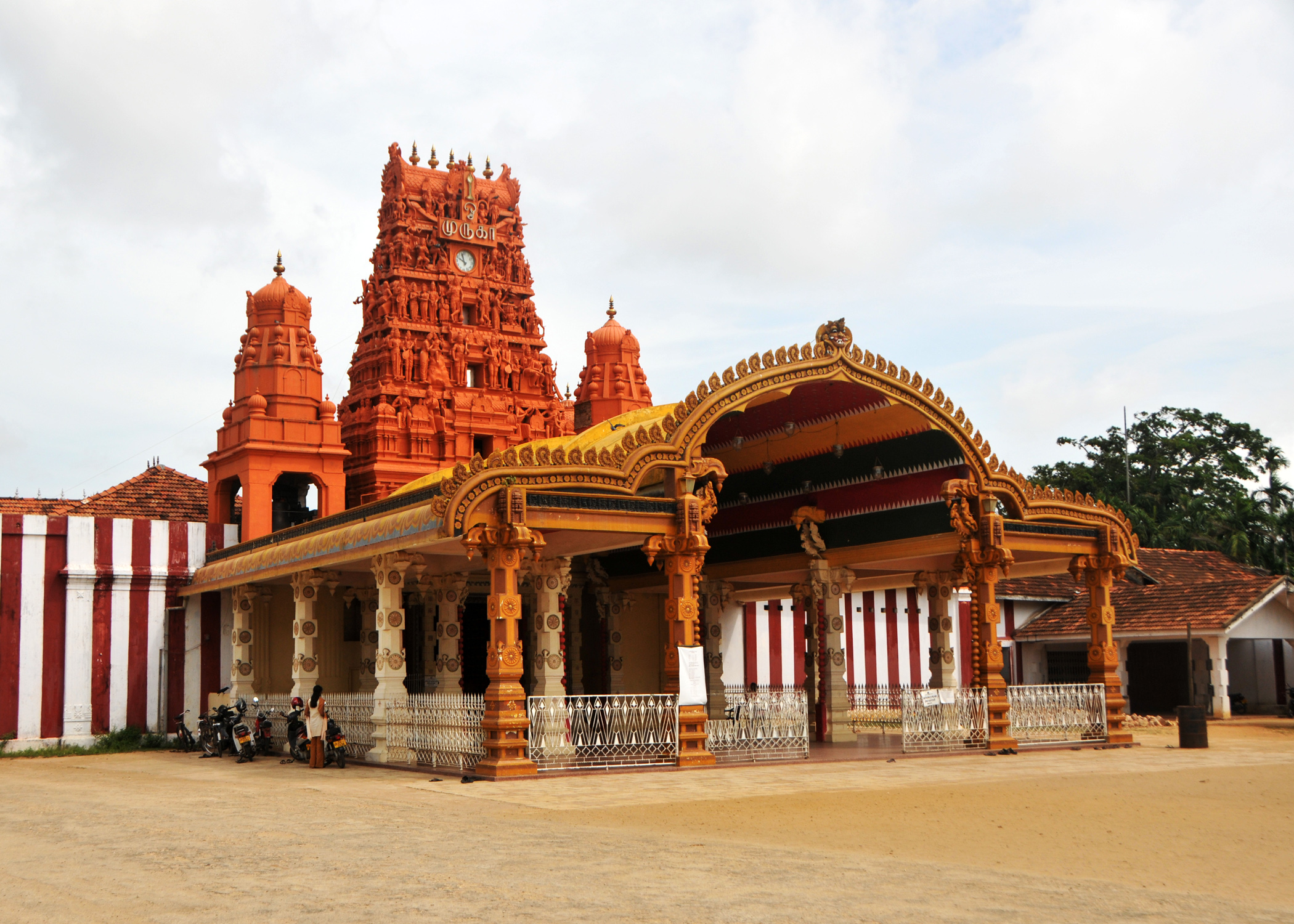
- Nallur Kandasawny Kovil

- Location within Northern Province
- Coordinates: 9°40′0″N 80°02′0″E
- Country: Sri Lanka
- Province: Northern
- District: Jaffna
- DS Division: Nallur

Nallur (Tamil: நல்லூர்; Sinhala: නල්ලූර්) is an affluent suburb in Jaffna, Sri Lanka. It is located 3 km south from Jaffna city centre. Nallur is most famous for Nallur Kandaswamy temple, one of Sri Lanka's most sacred place of pilgrimage for Sri Lankan Hindus. Nallur is also famous for being the historical capital of the old Jaffna Kingdom and birthplace of renowned philosopher and theologian, Arumuka Navalar.

== Etymology ==
The name Nall-ur was colloquially used by natives in Jaffna to refer to the town as the 'place of high castes'. The first part of the word Nallur ( Nall ) derives from the Tamil word ‘Nalla’ which means 'good'. In the past, it was Tamil linguistic tradition to refer to somebody of a higher or more socially upward caste as 'Nalla akkal' (good people). The second part to the name ( Ur ) means place or region.

This loosely used name for the town is believed to have been adopted in the 17th century, replacing its original regal name of 'Singai Nagar' after the collapse of the Jaffna Kingdom.

== History ==
Nallur's proclamation as capital can be traced to the earliest origins of the Jaffna Kingdom by the first Aryacakravarti king, Kalinga Magha while Kopay was second capital of the Jaffna Kingdom. For years it was the focal point at which political, religious and cultural importance was built and domain of the ruling elite of royalty, ministers and other officials of the kingdom. Soon after its proclamation as capital, in 948 A.D the first temple was built by Puvenaya Vaku, chief minister to King Kalinga Magha for Lord Murugan in a place called Kurukkal Valavu in Nallur.

The mid 15th century witnessed invading Sinhalese armies sent from the south to capture the capital Nallur and bring Jaffna under the suzerainty of Kotte. At the helm of this operation was Prince Sapumal Kumaraya (Bhuvanekabahu VI of Kotte) – who successfully ousted the native Tamil king of Jaffna Kanakasooriya Cinkaiariyan to India to instead instate himself as regional ruler. The early years of his rule were noted as being oppressive with the destruction of Nallur temple in 1450 and the renaming of Nallur with the Sinhalese name 'Srirangabodhi Bhuvanesubagu'. However, later regretting his actions Prince Sapumal Kumaraya embarked on building programmes to heighten the splendor of Nallur's past. Fueled by this, in 1457 efforts begun to reconstructing the temple a few kilometers eastwards from its original location to a place called ‘Muthirai Chanthai’ which was then a bustling market place. The death of Prince Sapumal Kumaraya's father Parakramabahu VI in 1467 consequently left Prince Sapumal Kumaraya no other choice but to leave Nallur to take kingship over the Kingdom of Kotte. With the absence of Prince Sapumal Kumaraya, the Tamil kingdom quickly re-established itself with the return of Kanakasooriya Cinkaiariyan to Nallur.

In 1621 a new threat from invading Portuguese imperialist brought an end to the four centuries-long Aryacakravarti dynasty once and for all. Commandor Philip de Oliverira sanctioned Nallur temple be destroyed to its foundations again along with all the royal palace buildings and any other buildings hinting of the past glory of the capital. All that remains is the facade of what is believed to have once been the gateway to one of the palace buildings. This is now mapped as ‘Sangali Thoppu’. The very spot on which the 15th century Nallur Kandaswamy temple was located now stands St. James' Church, Nallur, erected by the Portuguese but later rebuilt and changed from the denomination of the Roman Catholic Church into Anglican during British occupancy in 1827.

Under a calmer Dutch rule, permission was eventually secured for the temple to be built at its original site in Kurukkal Valavu. Given its long history of demolition it was thought a simpler style was best suited for the reconstruction of the temple rather than anything heavily ornate. Though the temple has undergone a series of changes in appearance, it remains in the present site from when it was rebuilt in 1749. During the thirty-year-long civil war Nallur was seen as a comparatively safe haven for people living across the Jaffna peninsula. The strict no fire zone imposed by the Sri Lankan Air Force over Nallur temple in 1987 resulted in a wave of displaced people from all over the peninsula seeking refuge in the temple and its immediate surroundings.

== Tradition ==
All of the historical information contained above is based on local tradition, or word of mouth handed down from father to son. Documentary proof to substantiate the transition of the capital from the Aryachakrvarti rule through to Colonial rule and to modern times remains rather blurred. However, there is a verbal tradition accepted by the older families and peoples of the peninsula that deals with the transition of the town of Nallur during the last days of the Kingdom of Jaffna which reads as follows: This information citing the is found on a Wikipedia article titled Tissanayagam family and on a corresponding website maintained by the family. The Yalpana Vaipava Malai also mentions nine other villages of Jaffna in connection with Prince Paranirupasinghe, at the time of the transition of the Kingdom to colonial rule. It states “that the usurper King Sankili in order to appease Prince Paranirupasinghe (the legitimate heir) appointed him co-regent over seven villages, namely Kalliyan-kadu, Mallakam, Sandiruppai, Arali, Achchuveli, Uduppiddi, and Kachchai. After the fall of the Jaffna Kingdom; and the execution of Sankili, the Portuguese, in recognition of Paranirupasinhe’s loyalty to them appointed him the chief minister of the realm. They also reconfirmed his authority over the seven villages over which he was co-regent under Sankili. In addition they also gave him Nallur the capital, and the village of Mathakal. Many years later, before his death, Paranirupasinghe is said to have re-distributed these villages amongst his descendents as follows:”

“ He gave: 1. Nallur and Kalliyan-kadu to Alakanmai-valla-muthali and placed him in his palace of Nallur. 2. Mallakam to Thanapala-singka-muthali; 3. Sandiruppai to Vetti-vela-yutha muthali; 4. Arali to Visaya-theyventhira-muthali; 5. Achchuveli to Thida-vira-singka-muthali; 6. Uduppiddi to Santhirasekara-mappana muthali; 7. Kachchai to Iraya-redna-muthali; 8. Mathakal to his daughter Vetha-Valliyar whom he bestowed in marriage to a Vellalan of that district.”

However, none of the available Portuguese documents of the period corroborate the above information, nor do any of the names mentioned above appear therein.

== Demography ==
Nallur, like most other towns in Jaffna, is made up of predominantly Tamil people. The social importance of Nallur temple also correlates with the Shaiva sect of Hinduism being the most popular religion. Nallur, having been the place from which various Aryacakravarti kings ruled was also the surface of Tamil aristocracy. This is reflected in the castes of those still living in Nallur today, generally seen as more upwards in the caste system, being mostly Chettiar and Vellalar. Prior to the Sri Lankan Tamil diaspora, Nallur was home to the highest level of Chettiar found anywhere else in the peninsula. This is remnant even today in the names of roads in Nallur like ‘ Chetty street’. Nallur for centuries now has also been home to the largest clan of Brahmins (priestly caste) as a result of Nallur temple being the single largest employer of priests – tending to be concentrated in close vicinity to temple grounds. Tradition has it this is why the present location of Nallur Kandaswami temple is called ‘Kurrukkal Valavu’ – meaning land of the chief priests.

== Gallery ==
Nallur Gallery
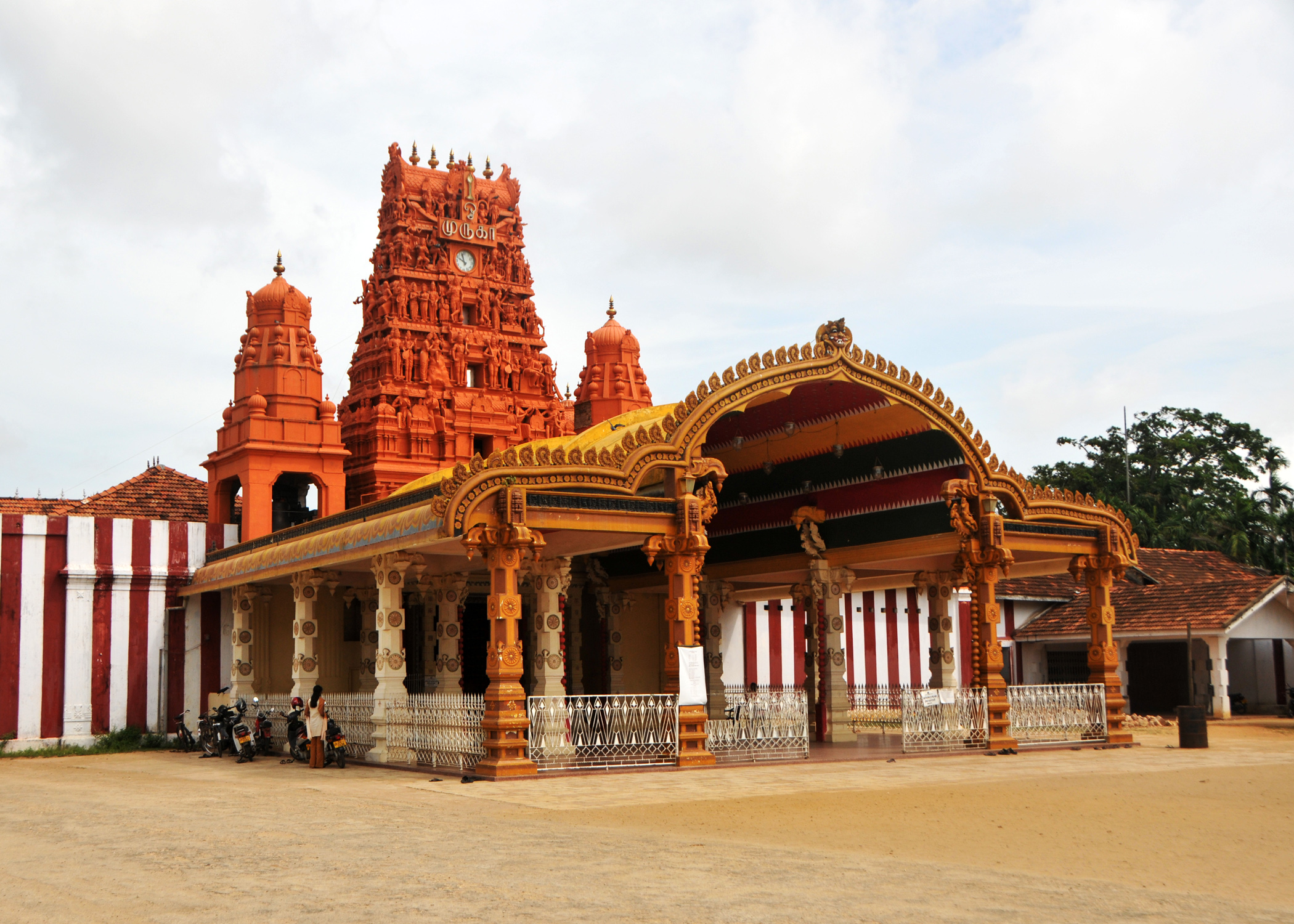
Nallur Kandasamy temple’s front gopuram overlooking Point Pedro road.

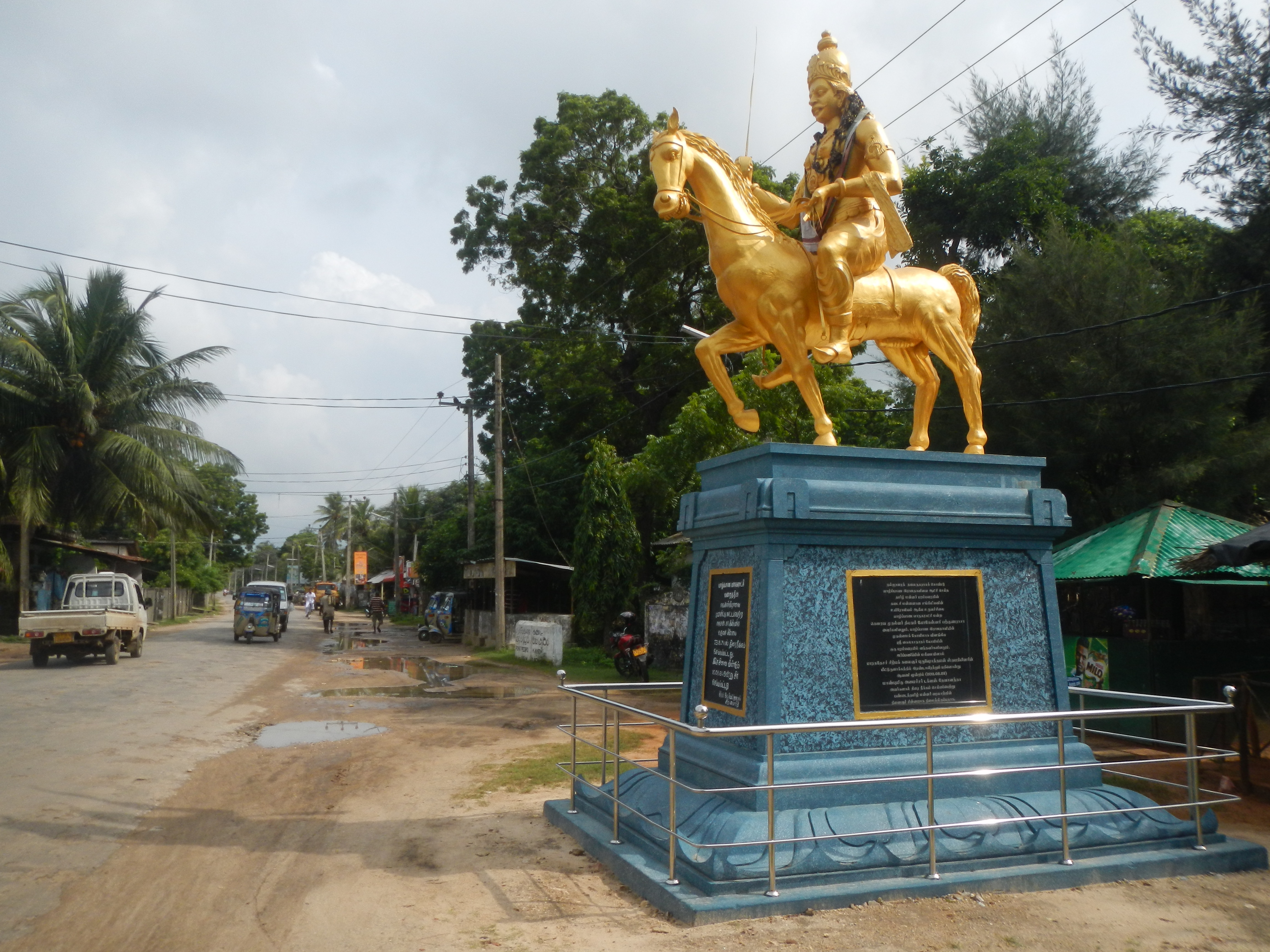
Sangiliyan Statue, Muthirai Chanthai, Nallur.

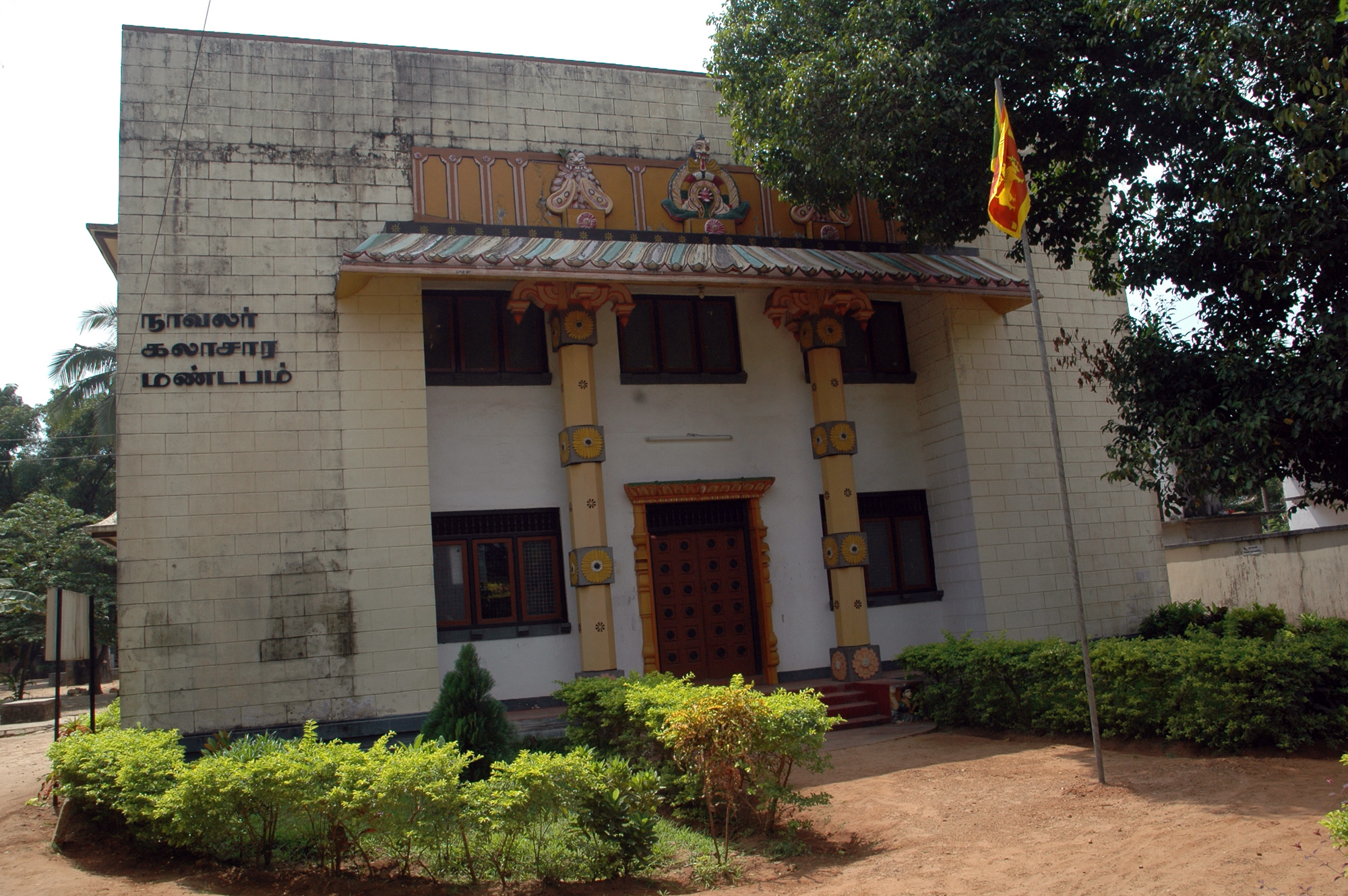
Navalar Cultural Hall

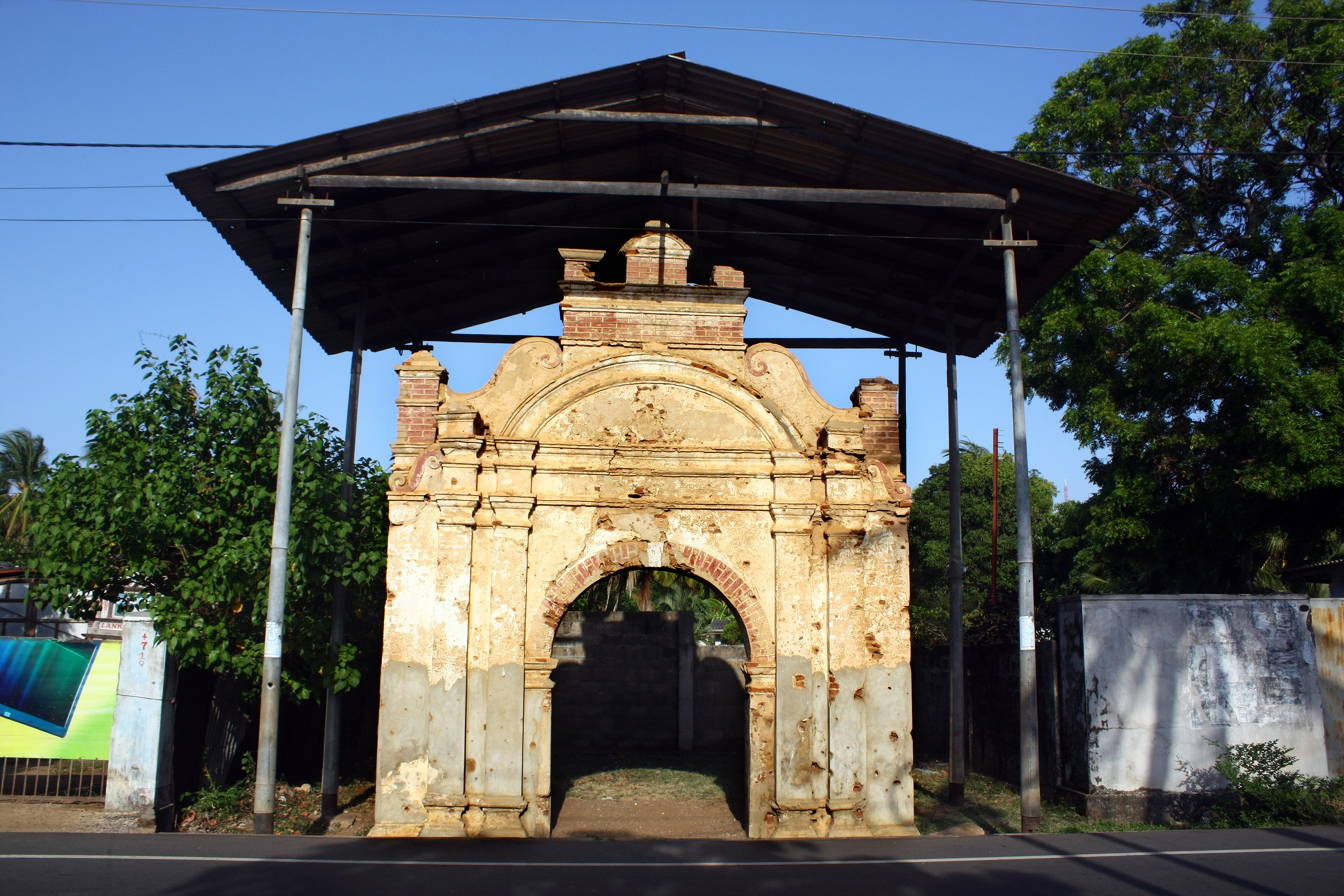
Cankili Thopu, Tomb of King Cankili

== See also ==
- Jaffna Palace ruins
- Nallur Kandaswamy Kovil
