= Dhamika Bulankulame =

Sri Lankan cricketer (born 1965)

Personal information
- Born: 28 June 1965 (age 61); Kandy, Sri Lanka
- Source: Cricinfo, 10 February 2016

Dhamika Bulankulame (born 28 June 1965) is a Sri Lankan former first-class cricketer who played for Colts Cricket Club.
