= Indra Dassanayake =

Sri Lankan professor

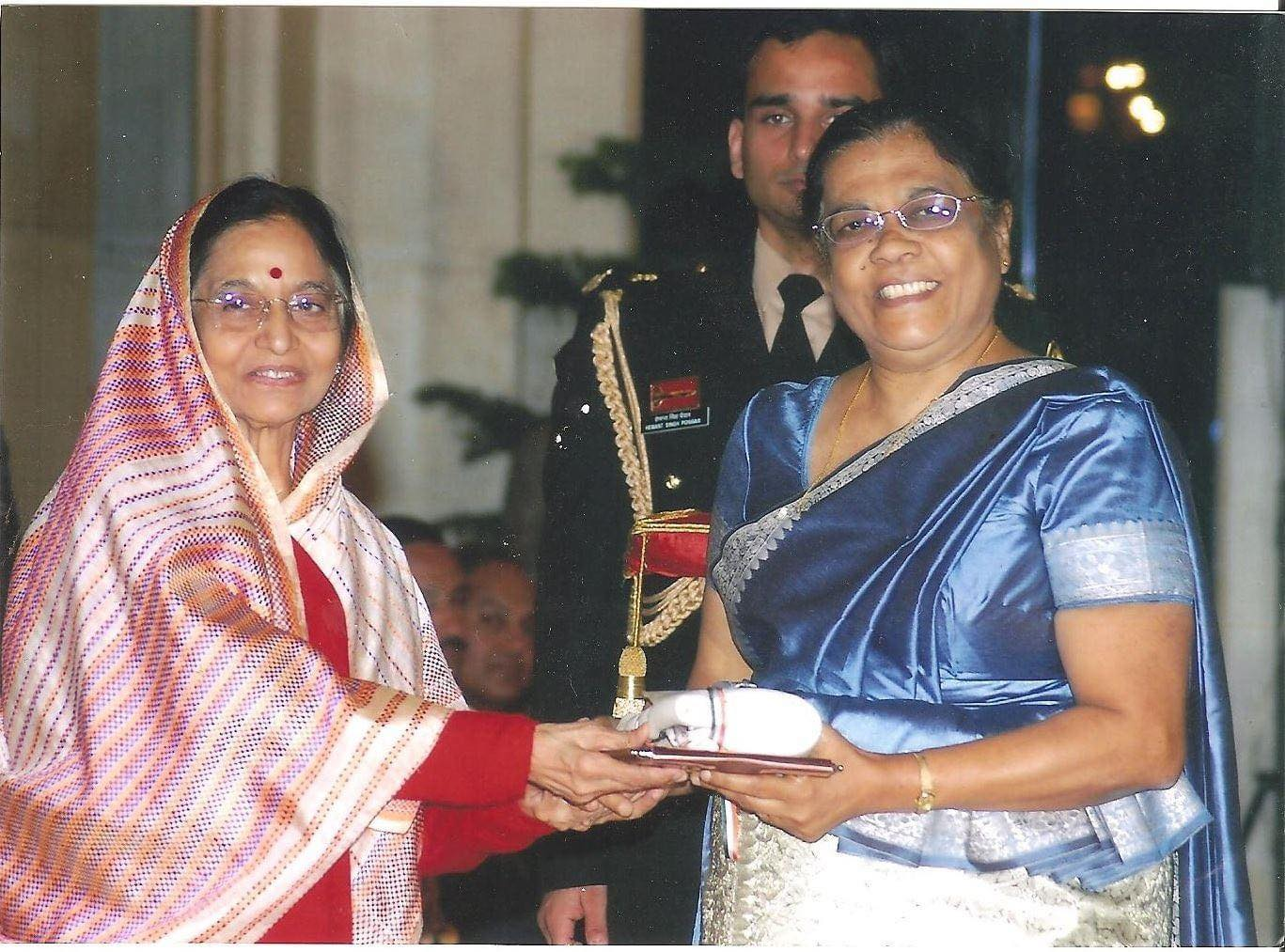
- Dassanayake (right) in 2007
- Born: 1943; India
- Died: September 2019 (aged 76); Colombo, Sri Lanka
- Education: University of Lucknow
- Occupation: Emeritus Professor
- Organization(s): University of Kelaniya, Sri Lanka

Indra Dassanayake was a Sri Lankan academic, emeritus professor in Hindi, a scholar known for promoting the Hindi language and North Indian culture in Sri Lanka through educational institutions. On 26 January 2020, she was conferred the Padma Shri award posthumously.

== Career ==
Dassanayake attended the University of Lucknow. After returning from India, she introduced the Hindi language into the Sri Lankan education system. She was also a professor of Hindi at the Kelaniya University. She participated in the first World Hindi Conference in 1975 that was held in Nagpur.

== Honours ==
In 2020, Dassanayake received the Padma Shri award from the Government of India for her contribution to North Indian Literature & Education in Hindi. It was also the first instance a Sri Lankan received the award since 2002.
