= Jayasena Dissanayake =

Sri Lankan politician

Jayasena Dissanayake was a Sri Lankan politician who belonged to the United National Party. He was the Mayor of Anuradhpura and later the Chief Minister of North Central Province in Sri Lanka from May 1996 to June 1998 after which the council was dissolved and elections postponed till 1999 which his party lost.
