= Triune mind, triune brain =

Theoretical model developed by Canadian Buddhist scholar Suwanda H. J. Sugunasiri

Triune mind, triune brain is a theoretical model developed by Canadian Buddhist scholar Suwanda H. J. Sugunasiri. It follows upon his clarification of the three terms used by the Buddha for consciousness, namely, Mano, Citta and Viññāṇa as can be seen in his work on the triune mind. Looking into the fields of Pali Buddhism, neuroscience, anthropology, linguistics, and embryology, among others, the overall thrust of this research moves toward a formalization and scientific refinement, done by assimilating functions of the mind as known in the Sutta and the Abhidamma with structures of the brain according to evolutionary biology.

== Summary ==
In this work, Sugunasiri primarily seeks to correlate Buddhist concepts with Paul MacLean's theory of the triune brain - reptilian, paleomammalian, and protomammalian. He shows how the Buddha's term sattā, meaning 'sentient being', covers both humans and animals, each having the six senses, including the sixth mind-sense. Then he goes on to show how the concept can be helpful in reviving and understanding MacLean's theory, reinterpreting and rebranding the three brains as protosentient, paleosentient, and neosentient. Through the use of Pali terminology, he shows how the Buddhist analysis serves a fuller understanding of the theory of mind.

MacLean's newly branded theory meets the Buddhian (his term, meaning 'of the Buddha' – cf. Einstein > Einsteinian) triune mind, its components, Citta, Mano, and Viññāṇa characterized in the following words: "The six senses would constitute Mano, the total working of the mindbody […] Viññāṇa and the vacillations in relation to values-conditioned behaviour constituting Citta."

=== Sugunasiri's reinterpretation ===
Interpreted on the basis of an Abhidhamma analysis as receiving mind, judging mind, and executive mind, they are shown to fit within Maclean's triune brain structure. Taking up the protosentient (reptilian) brain first, he compares the functions of the basal ganglia (and medulla oblongata) with those of Citta; the paleosentient (paleomammalian) brain in the hypothalamus (and thalamus) is compared to Viññāṇa; and finally the neosentient (neomammalian) brain in the amygdala aligns with Mano.

Sugunasiri	MacLean	Buddhism (function)	Brain physiology
Neosentient	Neomammalian	Mano (receiving)	Amygdala
Paleosentient	Paleomammalian	Viññāṇa (executive)	Hypothalamus (thalamus)
Protosentient	Reptilian	Citta (judging)	Basal ganglia (medulla oblongata)

=== Other critical points ===
While the parallelism is the central theme of the research, there are other critical points to his theory building. The Buddhian notion of "stream of consciousness" (viññāṇasota), e.g., is explained in relation to neuronal behaviour and Citta as neuropeptides. One chapter looks at the mind in the context of embryonic development, looked at from both the Westernscientific as well as the Buddhist viewpoints. The Buddhian notion of rebecoming is explored in relation to the evolution of the brain, and MacLean's puzzle about an evolutionary common thread to connect non-humans of the past with humans of the present is answered with a reminder of how satta, 'sentient being', is common to animals and humans alike.

A quick review of the Four Noble Truths is a further reminder that sentient beings are driven by the "triple thirsts" (sense-thirst (kāma taṇhā), 'thirst to be' (bhava taõhà), 'thirst to be not' (vibhava taṇhā) and the triple blemish roots (passion (rāga), hatred (dosa), and delusion (moha)). Sugunasiri relates the triple thirsts to self-preservation (as in Western evolutionary theory) and the triple blemish roots to the continuity of the species. Responding to MacLean's search for "animal mentations" and "inherited folklore", Citta is shown to be the mind that serves as the medium through which they are carried across lifetimes, and life-lines where neuropeptides serve as the medium containing information relating to the stimulus, when the "message" is carried through to the next neuron, jumping across the synapse, more descriptively, synaptic gap. Sugunairi writes, in what is perhaps the first attempt, in scientific terms, at explaining rebecoming (i.e., life after life, but popularly rebirth): "The Citta may carry the load of the Triple Thirsts and the Triple Blemish Roots through the synapse between life A and life B". The two neurons on either side of the gap are used as paralleling two lifetimes, the first ending at death and the subsequent life beginning with conception, characterized as "relinking Citta" (paṭisandhi). Mitochondrial DNA is argued to be the content of Citta, the neuropeptides.

=== Conclusion ===
Sugunasiri ends his work with a bit of a twist. Although the triple functions of the mind as in Buddhian characterization has been "housed" in MacLean's rebranded three brain structure, the brain is described as only the centralized home of Citta, Vinanna and Mano. He ends his book in a scientifically concise way, maintaining a non-dualistic approach to mind and body while unifying concepts of Pali Buddhism with Western science, leaving an enhanced new position in its wake.
