= Gandhabbakāya Saṃyutta =

The Gandhabbakāya Saṃyutta is a Buddhist scripture of the Pali Canon. It is the 31st Saṃyutta in the Saṃyutta Nikāya, placed in the Khandha Vaggasaṃyutta.

== Content ==
The Gandhabbakāya Saṃyutta, also known as the Linked Discourses on Fairies, provides basic accounts of the nature of the gandhabbas (Pali; Sanskrit: gandharvas); minor deities in Buddhist mythology associated with music, plants, and scents. The Buddha describes these beings in regards to their mode of birth, habitation, as well as the reasons one may be reborn among them.

=== Suttas ===
A total of 112 suttas are found in the text. Suttas 4-12, 13-22 and 23-112 are each abbreviated into a single discourse.

1) Suddhika Sutta
2) Sucarita Sutta
3) Mūlagandhadātā Sutta
4-12) Sāragandhādidātāsuttanavaka
13-22) Mūlagandhadānūpakārasuttadasaka
23-112) Sāragandhādidānūpakārasuttanavutika

== English translations ==
- Sutta Central: Bhikkhu Sujato
- Mettanet Tipitaka Index: Bhikkhuni Uppalavanna

== See also ==
- Gandharva
- Saṃyutta Nikāya
