= Saṃyutta Nikāya =

3rd Buddhist Scriptures Collection in Pāli Canon

- SuttaCentral; OpenTipitaka
- Type: Canonical text
- Parent: Sutta Piṭaka
- Attribution: Mahākassapa; Bhāṇaka
- Aṭṭhakathā: Sāratthappakāsinī (Saṁyuttanikāya-aṭṭhakathā)
- Commentator: Buddhaghosa
- Ṭīkā: Līnatthappakāsinī (Sagāthāvaggaṭīkā, Nidānavaggaṭīkā, Khandhavaggaṭīkā, Saḷāyatanavaggaṭīkā, Mahāvaggaṭīkā)
- Abbreviation: SN; S

The Saṃyutta Nikāya ("Connected Discourses" or "Kindred Sayings") is a Buddhist scriptures collection, the third of the five Nikāyas, or collections, in the Sutta Piṭaka, which is one of the "three baskets" that compose the Pāli Tipiṭaka of Theravāda Buddhism. Because of the abbreviated way parts of the text are written, the total number of suttas/sūtras is unclear. The editor of the Pali Text Society edition of the text made it 2889, Bodhi in his translation has 2904, while the commentaries give 7762. A study by Rupert Gethin gives the totals for the Burmese and Sinhalese editions as 2854 and 7656, respectively, and his own calculation as 6696; he also says the total in the Thai edition is unclear. The suttas/sūtras are grouped into five vaggas/vargas, or sections. Each vagga/varga is further divided into saṃyuttas/saṃyuktas, or chapters, each of which in turn contains a group of suttas/sūtras on a related topic.

== History ==
=== Dating ===
Bhante Sujato argues that the remarkable congruence of the various recensions suggests that the Saṃyutta Nikāya/Saṃyukta Āgama was the only collection to be finalized in terms of both structure and content in the pre-sectarian period. Yet, whereas the Aṅguttara Nikāya and the Ekottarika Āgama share the same structure of proceeding from Ones to Elevens, the Saṃyutta Nikāya and the Saṃyukta Āgama exhibit considerable structural differences, not only in the form of different sequences of saṃyuttas but also in the form of some saṃyuttas being found only in one of the two collections. Comparative study also brings to light significant differences in content between the Saṃyutta Nikāya and the Saṃyukta Āgama. In fact, the proposed earliness of the relies on the three-aṅga theory, which has met with substantial criticism. Different canonical accounts of the first saṅgīti indeed agree on reporting that the Saṃyutta Nikāya or Saṃyukta Āgama came into existence at the same time as the other Nikāyas or Āgamas, namely as part of a division of the orally transmitted teachings undertaken soon after the Buddha's funeral.

=== Correspondence with the Saṃyukta Āgama ===
The Saṃyutta Nikāya corresponds to the Saṃyukta Āgama found in the Sutra Piṭakas of various early Buddhists schools, fragments of which survive in Sanskrit and in Tibetan translation. A complete Chinese translation from the Mūlasarvāstivādin recension appears in the Chinese Buddhist canon, where it is known as the Zá Āhánjīng (雜阿含經); meaning "the mixed āgama". A comparison of the Mūlasarvāstivādin, allegedly Kāśyapīya, and Theravādin texts reveals a considerable consistency of content, although each recension contains suttas/sutras not found in the others. The Collation and Annotation of Saṃyuktāgama (《<雜阿含經>校釋, Chinese version) makes further comparison.

== Divisions ==
The vaggas contained in this nikāya are (the numbering of chapters [saṃyutta] here refers to the PTS and Burmese editions; the Sinhalese and Thai editions divide the text up somewhat differently):

Vagga Name	Description	Samyutta Number	Samyutta Names
Part I. Sagatha-vagga	a collection of suttas containing verses (Pāli, sagatha), many shared by other parts of the Pāli canon such as the Theragatha, Therīgatha, Suttanipāta, Dhammapada and the Jātakas.	SN 1-11	1.devatāsaṃyuttaṃ: 2. devaputtasaṃyuttaṃ; 3. kosalasaṃyuttaṃ; 4. mārasaṃyuttaṃ; 5. bhikkhunīsaṃyuttaṃ; 6. brahmasaṃyuttaṃ; 7. brāhmaṇasaṃyuttaṃ; 8. vaṅgīsasaṃyuttaṃ; 9. vanasaṃyuttaṃ; 10. yakkhasaṃyuttaṃ; 11. sakkasaṃyuttaṃ
Part II. Nidana-vagga	a collection of suttas primarily pertaining to causation (Pali, nidana)	SN 12-21	12. nidānasaṃyuttaṃ; 13. abhisamayasaṃyuttaṃ; 14. dhātusaṃyuttaṃ; 15. anamataggasaṃyuttaṃ; 16. kassapasaṃyuttaṃ; 17. lābhasakkārasaṃyuttaṃ; 18. rāhulasaṃyuttaṃ; 19. lakkhaṇasaṃyuttaṃ; 20. opammasaṃyuttaṃ; 21. bhikkhusaṃyuttaṃ
Part III. Khandha-vagga	a collection of suttas primarily pertaining to the five aggregates (Pali, khandha)	SN 22-34	22. khandhasaṃyuttaṃ; 23. rādhasaṃyuttaṃ; 24. diṭṭhisaṃyuttaṃ; 25. okkantasaṃyuttaṃ; 26. uppādasaṃyuttaṃ; 27. kilesasaṃyuttaṃ; 28. sāriputtasaṃyuttaṃ; 29. nāgasaṃyuttaṃ; 30. supaṇṇasaṃyuttaṃ; 31. gandhabbakāyasaṃyuttaṃ; 32. valāhakasaṃyuttaṃ; 33. vacchagottasaṃyuttaṃ; 34. jhānasaṃyuttaṃ
Part IV. Salayatana-vagga	a collection of suttas primarily pertaining to the six sense bases (Pali, salayatana), including the "Fire Sermon" (Adittapariyaya Sutta)	SN 35-44	35. saḷāyatanasaṃyuttaṃ; 36. vedanāsaṃyuttaṃ; 37. mātugāmasaṃyuttaṃ; 38. jambukhādakasaṃyuttaṃ; 39. sāmaṇḍakasaṃyuttaṃ; 40. moggallānasaṃyuttaṃ; 41. cittasaṃyuttaṃ; 42. gāmaṇisaṃyuttaṃ; 43. asaṅkhatasaṃyuttaṃ; 44. abyākatasaṃyuttaṃ
Part V. Maha-vagga	the largest – that is, great (Pali, maha) – collection	SN 45. the Noble Eightfold Path	45. maggasaṃyuttaṃ
Part V. Maha-vagga	the largest – that is, great (Pali, maha) – collection	SN 46. the Seven Factors of Enlightenment	46. bojjhaṅgasaṃyuttaṃ
Part V. Maha-vagga	the largest – that is, great (Pali, maha) – collection	SN 47. the Four Establishment of Mindfulness	47. satipaṭṭhānasaṃyuttaṃ
Part V. Maha-vagga	the largest – that is, great (Pali, maha) – collection	SN 48. the Faculties	48. indriyasaṃyuttaṃ
Part V. Maha-vagga	the largest – that is, great (Pali, maha) – collection	SN 49. the Four Right Striving	49. sammappadhānasaṃyuttaṃ
Part V. Maha-vagga	the largest – that is, great (Pali, maha) – collection	SN 50. the Five Powers	50. balasaṃyuttaṃ
Part V. Maha-vagga	the largest – that is, great (Pali, maha) – collection	SN 51. the Four Bases for Spiritual Power	51. iddhipādasaṃyuttaṃ
Part V. Maha-vagga	the largest – that is, great (Pali, maha) – collection	SN 52. Anuruddha discourses	52. anuruddhasaṃyuttaṃ
Part V. Maha-vagga	the largest – that is, great (Pali, maha) – collection	SN 53. the Jhanas	53. jhānasaṃyuttaṃ
Part V. Maha-vagga	the largest – that is, great (Pali, maha) – collection	SN 54. Mindfulness of Breathing	54. ānāpānasaṃyuttaṃ
Part V. Maha-vagga	the largest – that is, great (Pali, maha) – collection	SN 55. Factors of Stream-entry	55. sotāpattisaṃyuttaṃ
Part V. Maha-vagga	the largest – that is, great (Pali, maha) – collection	SN 56. the Truths	56. saccasaṃyuttaṃ

== Translations ==
=== Full translations ===
- The Book of the Kindred Sayings, tr C. A. F. Rhys Davids & F. L. Woodward, 1917–30, 5 volumes, Bristol: Pali Text Society
- The Connected Discourses of the Buddha, tr Bhikkhu Bodhi, 2000, Wisdom Publications, Somerville, MA, ISBN 0-86171-331-1; the Pali Text Society also issues a private edition of this for members only, which is its preferred translation
- Bhikkhu Sujato (trans.), The “Linked” or “Connected” Discourses, 2018, published online at SuttaCentral and released into the public domain.

=== Selections ===
- anthology published by Buddhist Publication Society, Kandy, Sri Lanka
- Nidana Samyutta, published in Burma; reprinted Sri Satguru, Delhi

== See also ==
- Aṅguttara Nikāya
- Early Buddhist Texts
- Dīgha Nikāya
- Khuddaka Nikāya
- Majjhima Nikāya
- Pāli Canon
- Sutta Piṭaka
- Supaṇṇa Saṃyutta
- Ādittapariyāya Sutta
- Anattalakkhaṇa Sutta
- Dhammacakkappavattana Sutta

== Bibliography ==
- Bhikkhu Bodhi (trans.) (2000). The Connected Discourses of the Buddha: A Translation of the Saṃyutta Nikāya. Boston: Wisdom Publications. ISBN 0-86171-331-1.
- Digital Dictionary of Buddhism, entry on Zá Ahánjīng
- The Collation and Annotation of Saṃyuktāgama《<雜阿含經>校釋》,(Chinese version). Wang Jianwei and Jin Hui, East China Normal University Press, 2014.
