= Ādittapariyāya Sutta =

Buddhist scripture in Pāli Canon

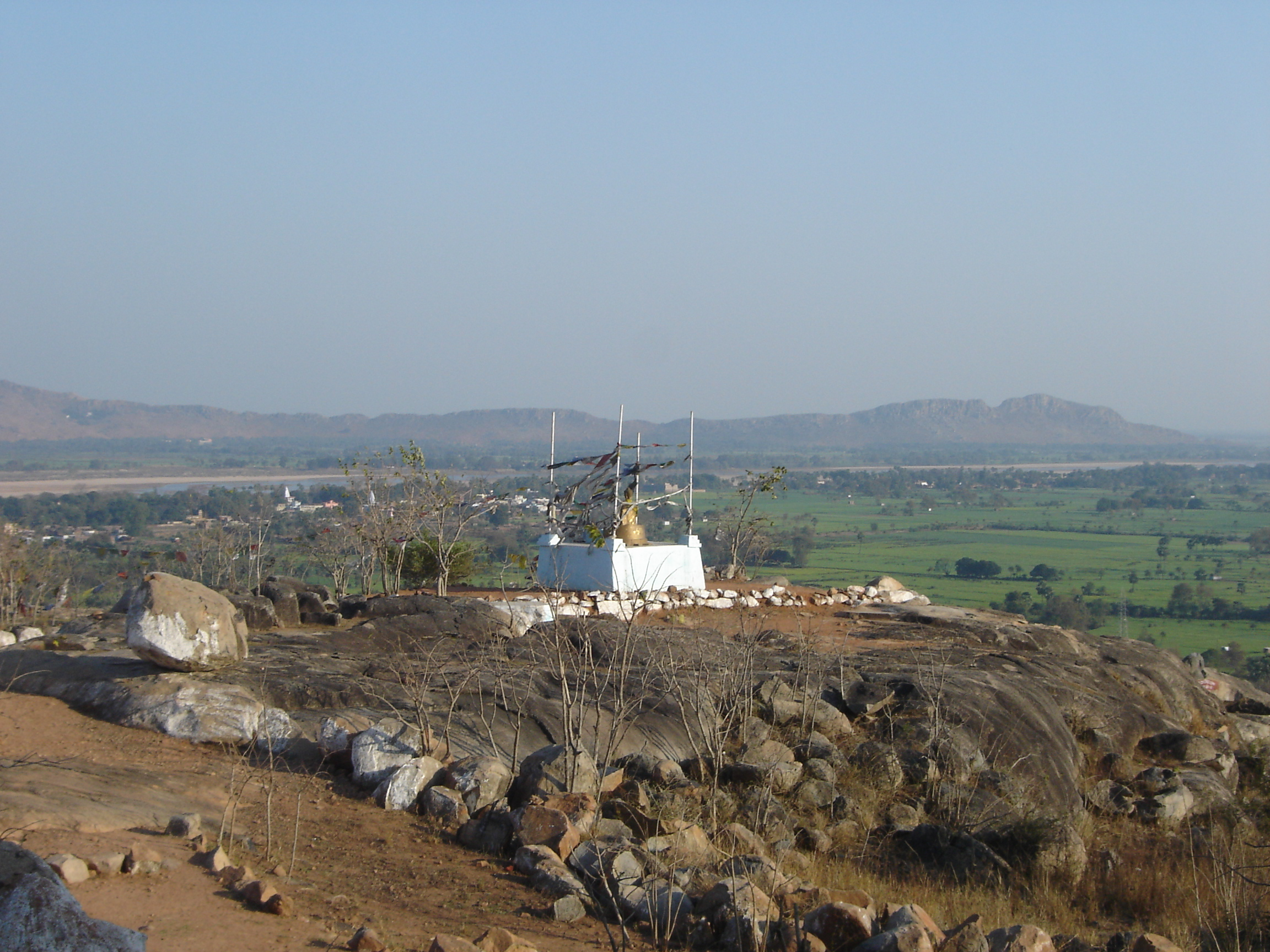
Gayasisa or Brahmayoni hill, where Buddha taught the Fire Sermon.

The Ādittapariyāya Sutta (Pāli, "Fire Sermon Discourse"), is a discourse from the Pāli Canon, popularly known as the Fire Sermon. In this discourse, the Buddha preaches about achieving liberation from suffering through detachment from the five senses and mind.

In the Pāli Canon, the Ādittapariyāya Sutta is found in the Saṃyutta Nikāya ("Connected Collection," abbreviated as either "SN" or "S") and is designated either by its number "SN 35.28" or by its location in the PTS edition as "S iv 19". Another less common denotation is "S iv 1.3.6." This discourse is also found in the Buddhist monastic code (Vinaya) at Vin I 35.

English speakers might be familiar with the name of this discourse due to T. S. Eliot's titling the third section of his celebrated poem The Waste Land "The Fire Sermon." In a footnote, Eliot states that this Buddhist discourse "corresponds in importance to the Sermon on the Mount."

== Background ==
In the Suttas, the Fire Sermon is the third discourse delivered by the Buddha (after the Dhammacakkapavattana Sutta and the Anattalakkhaṇa Sutta), several months after his enlightenment, on top of the Gayasisa Hill, near Gaya, India. He delivered it to a thousand newly converted ascetics who formerly practiced a sacred fire ritual (Pāli: aggihutta; Skt.: agnihotra).

The 5th-century CE post-canonical Pāli commentary, Sāratthappakāsini (Spk.), attributed to Buddhaghosa, draws a direct connection between the ascetics' prior practices and this discourse's main rhetorical device:

Having led the thousand bhikkhus monks to Gayā's Head, the Blessed One reflected, 'What kind of Dhamma talk would be suitable for them?' He then realized, 'In the past they worshipped the fire morning and evening. I will teach them that the twelve sense bases are burning and blazing. In this way they will be able to attain arahantship.'

== Text ==
In this discourse, the Buddha describes the sense bases and resultant mental phenomena as "burning" with passion, aversion, delusion and suffering. Seeing such, a noble disciple becomes disenchanted with, dispassionate toward and thus liberated from the senses bases, achieving arahantship. This is described in more detail below.

After a prefatory paragraph identifying this discourse's location of deliverance (Gaya) and audience (a thousand monks or bhikkhus), the Buddha proclaims (represented here in English and Pāli):

| "Bhikkhus, all is burning." | Sabbaṃ bhikkhave ādittaṃ |

Figure 1: The Pali Canon's Six Sextets:

sense bases (āyatana)

→

feeling ︵vedanā︶

→

craving ︵taṇhā︶

"internal"
sense
organs
<–>
"external"
sense
objects

↓
↓
↓
contact (phassa)
↓
↑

consciousness (viññāṇa)

1. The six internal sense bases are the eye, ear,
  nose, tongue, body & mind.
2. The six external sense bases are visible forms,
  sound, odor, flavors, touch & mental objects.
3. Sense-specific consciousness arises dependent
  on an internal & an external sense base.
4. Contact is the meeting of an internal sense
  base, external sense base & consciousness.
5. Feeling is dependent on contact.
6. Craving is dependent on feeling.
Source: MN 148 (Thanissaro, 1998) diagram details

The ensuing text reveals that "all" (sabba) refers to:

- the six internal sense bases (āyatana): eye, ear, nose, tongue, body and mind
- the six external sense bases: visible forms, sound, smells, tastes, touches and mental objects
- consciousness (viññāṇa) contingent on these sense bases
- the contact (samphassa) of a specific sense organ (such as the ear), its sense object (sound) and sense-specific consciousness.
- what is subsequently felt (vedayita): pleasure (sukha), pain (dukkha), or neither (adukkhamasukhaṃ).

By "burning" (āditta) is meant:

- the fire of passion (rāgaggi)
- the fire of aversion (dosaggi)
- the fire of delusion (mohaggi)
- the manifestations of suffering: birth, aging and death, sorrows, lamentations, pains, distresses and despairs.

According to the Buddha, a well-instructed noble disciple (sutavā ariyasāvako) sees this burning and thus becomes disenchanted (nibbindati) with the sense bases and their mental sequelae. The text then uses a formula found in dozens of discourses to describe the manner in which such disenchantment leads to liberation from suffering:

"Disenchanted, he becomes dispassionate.
Through dispassion, he is fully released.
With full release, there is the knowledge, 'Fully released.'
He discerns that 'Birth is ended,
the holy life fulfilled,
the task done.
There is nothing further for this world.'"

Nibbindaṃ virajjati
virāgā vimuccati,
vimuttasmiṃ vimuttamiti ñāṇaṃ hoti,
khīṇā jāti,
vusitaṃ brahmacariyaṃ,
kataṃ karaṇīyaṃ
nāparaṃ itthattāyāti pajānātī ti.

A closing paragraph reports that, during this discourse, the thousand monks in attendance became liberated.

== Related canonical discourses ==
While the central metaphor of burning combined with "the all" (sense bases, etc.) make this discourse unique in the Pāli canon, its core message can be found throughout, condensed and embellished in a number of instructive ways.

=== Andhabhūta/Addhabhūta Sutta (SN 35.29) ===
The very next discourse listed in the Saṃyutta Nikāya (SN 35.29) is nearly identical with the Fire Sermon with the significant exception that, instead of the central metaphor of the senses being "aflame" (āditta), this next discourse uses a different metaphor. Bhikkhu Bodhi notes that different editions of the Tipiṭaka vary as to what this subsequent discourse's central metaphor is: Sinhala editions use the term andhabhūta – meaning "figuratively blinded" or "ignorant" – while the Burmese edition and commentary use addhabhūta – meaning "weighed down." Regardless which edition is referenced, both the Fire Sermon and this subsequent discourse, with their seemingly diametric similes of burning and oppressiveness, underline that the senses, their objects and associated mental impressions are unto themselves beyond our complete control and are aversive; and, thus provide the escape of disenchantment, dispassion and release.

=== Āditta Sutta (SN 22.61) ===
In this discourse, instead of describing the sense bases (āyatana) as being aflame, the Buddha describes the five aggregates (khandha) in this manner:

"Bhikkhus, form is burning, feeling is burning, perception is burning, volitional formations are burning, consciousness is burning. Seeing thus, bhikkhus, the instructed noble disciple experiences revulsion towards form ... feeling ... perception ... volitional formations ... consciousness .... Through dispassion [this mind] is liberated...."

=== Kukkuḷa Sutta (SN 22.136) ===
Like the Fire Sermon, this discourse has a central metaphor related to fire – likening our physical and mental apparatus to hot embers (Pali: kukkuḷa) – and concludes with the well-instructed noble disciple becoming disenchanted with, dispassionate about and liberated from these burning constituents. Unlike the Fire Sermon, instead of using the sense bases and their mental sequelae as the basis for this burning and disenchantment, this discourse uses the five aggregates (khandha) for the underlying physical-mental framework.

=== Ādittapariyāya Sutta (SN 35.235) ===
Also entitled "Fire Sermon," this discourse cautions that it is better for an internal sense base (eye, ear, etc.) to be lacerated by a burning implement than for one to "grasp the sign" (nimittaggāho) of an external sense base (visible form, sound, etc.); for such grasping might lead to rebirth in a lower realm. Instead of grasping, the well-instructed noble disciple discriminates (paṭisañcikkhati) the impermanence of the internal sense base, external sense base, related consciousness and contact, and the resultant feeling. Such discrimination leads to liberation.

== Sources ==
- Allison, Alexander W., Herbert Barrows, Caesar R. Blake, Arthur J. Carr, Arthur M. Eastman and Hubert M. English Jr. (1975, rev.). The Norton Anthology of Poetry. NY: W.W. Norton Co. ISBN 0-393-09245-3.
- Bodhgaya News (n.d.), "Pali Canon Online Database," online search engine of Sri Lanka Tripitaka Project's (SLTP) Pali Canon, maintained by Dr. Peter Friedlander, formerly of La Trobe University (https://web.archive.org/web/20070927001234/http://www.chaf.lib.latrobe.edu.au/dcd/pali.htm). Retrieved 15 Sep 2011 at http://bodhgayanews.net/pali.htm.
- Bodhi, Bhikkhu (tr.) (2000). The Connected Discourses of the Buddha: A Translation of the Saṃyutta Nikāya. Boston: Wisdom Publications. ISBN 0-86171-331-1.
- Bodhi, Bhikkhu (2005). In the Buddha's Words: An Anthology of Discourses from the Pāli Canon. Boston: Wisdom Publications. ISBN 0-86171-491-1.
- Gombrich, Richard (1990). "Recovering the Buddha's message," in David Seyfort Ruegg & Lambert Schmithausen (eds.), Earliest Buddhism and Madhyamaka (1990). Leiden: E.J. Brill. ISBN 90-04-09246-3. Retrieved 26 Sep 2007 from "Google Book Search" at https://books.google.com/books?id=-mjH2kRdYQoC&dq=agnihotra+pali&pg=PA16
- Ñanamoli Thera (1981). Three Cardinal Discourses of the Buddha (The Wheel No. 17). Kandy: Buddhist Publication Society. Retrieved 26 Sep 2007 from "Access to Insight" (1995) at http://www.accesstoinsight.org/lib/authors/nanamoli/wheel017.html.
- Rhys Davids, T.W. & Hermann Oldenberg (tr.) (1881). Vinaya Texts. Oxford: Clarendon Press. Retrieved 26 Sep 2007 from "Internet Sacred Texts Archive" at http://www.sacred-texts.com/bud/sbe13/index.htm.
- Rhys Davids, T.W. & William Stede (eds.) (1921–5). The Pali Text Society’s Pali–English Dictionary. Chipstead: Pali Text Society. A general on-line search engine for the PED is available at http://dsal.uchicago.edu/dictionaries/pali/.
- Thanissaro Bhikkhu (tr.) (1993). Adittapariyaya Sutta: The Fire Sermon (SN 35.28). Retrieved 25 Sep 2007 from "Access to Insight" at http://www.accesstoinsight.org/tipitaka/sn/sn35/sn35.028.than.html.
- Vipassana Research Institute (n.d.), "The Pāḷi Tipiṭaka - Roman," online hierarchical organization of the Chaṭṭha Saṅgāyana Tipitaka. Retrieved 28 Sept 2007 from ""The Pāḷi Tipiṭaka" at http://www.tipitaka.org/romn/.
