= Triune Mind =

The Triune Mind is a model of the mind of The Buddha's teaching, as conceptualized by Canadian Buddhist scholar Suwanda H. J. Sugunasiri. The theory was first published as "Triune Mind in Buddhism: A Textual Exploration", in the Canadian Journal of Buddhist Studies. Given the use of the term "triune", it is a model, which distinguishes the mind into three divisions: receiving, judging and executive.

== Reason for study ==
The study is primarily a means of dissolving confusion, which exists as a result of the terminology used to describe the mind in the Pali Canon. The Buddha uses the terms Citta, Mano, and Viññāṇa to describe mind, sometimes to mean the same, but at other time to cover distinct aspects.

== Three terms for mind ==
Sugunasiri points out some of the confusion over the past century with regards to the interpretation of Citta, Mano and Viññāṇa.

Author	Citta	Mano	Viññāṇa
Dr. Rhys Davids (1899)	Heart	Mind	Consciousness
Ven. Rahula (1959)	Mind	Thought	Consciousness
Prof. Jayatilleka (1963)	Mind	Mind	Consciousness
Dr. Walshe (1995)	Thought	Mind	Consciousness
Ven. Bodhi (2000)	Mind	Mentality; Mind	Consciousness
Prof. Karunadasa (2010)	Bare Consciousness	Mind	Consciousness

Rather than forcing an assignment of the Pali Buddhist terms with an English equivalent Sugunasiri allocates Citta, Mano, and Viññāṇa each with a primary function: judgment, reception, and execution, respectively. This is based on his analysis of the 17 mindmoments of a Stream of Consciousness as in the Abhidhamma. as can be seen in fig. 17, pg. 22 of his work "Triune Mind in Buddhism: A Textual Exploration".

As mentioned, while Citta, Mano and Viññāṇa have their own functions, the most striking conclusion in Sugunasiri's analysis is that Viññāṇa is exclusively tied to a single given life. Mano, too, ceases to exist at the point of death. This means that Citta is the contractor that carries the building material life to life. This is based on Abhidhamma analysis where a relation between Rebecoming, both Citta (paṭisandhi citta) and Viññāṇa (paṭisandhi viññāṇa) occurs, but at the point of death there is only Citta (cuti citta).

Furthermore, the point is also made that Citta is present at the very point of conception, and Viññāṇa emerges only at the second Stream of Consciousness.

== Triune Mind as M-Simplex and M-Complex ==
The terms M-Simplex and M-Complex refer to the distinct overlapping, which exists within this model of the mind. The mind (M) is referred to as M-simplex insofar as its three constituting parts, Citta, Mano, and Vinnana, have separate functions. M-Complex, however, refers to the overlapping of the three, all of which is necessary for the mind, as a single model, to function as it does. In other words, the utilization between simple and complex shows how each part has a very specific role to play (each are eons apart) while remaining tightly intertwined with each other.
