= Greenville Goodwin =

American anthropologist (1907–1940)

Grenville Goodwin
- Born: Grenville Goodwin; 1907; Southampton, New York
- Died: 1940 (aged 32–33); Los Angeles, California
- Spouse: Janice Thompson (m. 1936)
- Children: 1

Academic background
- Education: University of Chicago (no degree)

Academic work
- Discipline: Anthropology
- Sub-discipline: Indigenous peoples of North America

Grenville Goodwin, born Grenville Goodwin (1907–1940), is best known for his participant-observer ethnology work among the Western Apache in the 1930s in the American Southwest. Largely self-taught as an anthropologist, he lived among the Apache for nearly a decade, and learned their stories and rituals. His monograph The Social Organization of the Western Apache was considered a major contribution to American ethnology. It was published in 1941 after his death at age 33, when his promising career was cut short.

Based on his studies, Goodwin classified the Western Apache into five groups, but some of these divisions have been disputed by other anthropologists and linguists. Researchers have generally agreed on three major groups: the White Mountain, San Carlos and Tonto Apache peoples (the latter are also known as Dilzhe'e Apache), with sub-groupings of bands below this classification.

== Early life and education ==
Goodwin was born in Southampton, New York to wealthy parents. He contracted tuberculosis when young (when there was no cure) and was sent to the Mesa Ranch School in Arizona for its dry climate, believed to be more healthful. This was the start of his long relationship with and interest in the Southwest. The dean, Byron Cummings, suggested that he study at the University of Arizona.

He attended classes at Arizona, but found that he was not interested in earning a degree. Goodwin moved progressively to live for the next decade near Apache communities at Bylas, Fort Apache, Canyon Day, and Cibecue. He talked extensively to the people, especially the elders, and they began to accept his attention. He studied informally and was largely self-taught, although he did some graduate work at the University of Chicago in 1939, when he completed his monograph on the social organization of the Western Apache.

== Career ==
During his work, Goodwin met and learned from many notable anthropologists. In 1931 he met Morris E. Opler, who was doing field work among the Chiricahua. Harry Joijer coached Goodwin in linguistic transcription. By 1935 he published his first paper in American Anthropologist, and published more in the following years. His close observations from several years of work with the Apache were recognized.

Following the Indian Reorganization Act of 1934, which enabled tribes to create self-government again, H. Scudder McKeel, a social anthropologist for the US Bureau of Indian Affairs, hired Goodwin to help work with the possible formation of a San Carlos Apache government. Goodwin worked as a consultant and completed a report circa 1937 on the formation of the San Carlos government. Although described as a model of social anthropology, the work was never published.

Starting graduate study in 1939, Goodwin worked with academics at the University of Chicago. There he also completed his monograph, The Social Organization of the Western Apache, which was considered a landmark when published in 1941 after his death. It made him a major figure in American ethnology and anthropology.

A 1942 review by G. A. Richard described it as "a handbook for the White Mountain, Cibecue, San Carlos and Tonto Apache." Richard noted that while the issue of chieftainship had not been treated adequately in the academic literature, Goodwin devoted considerable attention to the subject, stressing the obligations of chiefs as well as their privileges. Goodwin also discussed the origins of clans, which he said only the White Mountain Apache and Navajo had, of the Southern Athabaskan-speaking peoples. He thought the Apache clans related more to their religious practices, and may have been influenced by the neighboring Pueblo. Richard praised Goodwin's discussions of avoidance and joking behavior, for he included many exceptions (and the reasons for them) as well as the rules of practice, to show how the people varied in daily life.

The book was reprinted by the University of Arizona Press in 1969, including a short biography of Goodwin by the anthropologist Edward H. Spicer and a new index. The Press has also reprinted another book by Goodwin, as well as two new volumes collected from his papers and letters, which have been edited by others; all have been published posthumously as part of renewed interest in Goodwin's work.

== Controversy ==
Goodwin classified the Western Apache into five groups (based on his informants' views on dialect and cultural differences): White Mountain, Cibecue, San Carlos, North Tonto, and South Tonto. Other anthropologists, such as Albert Schroeder, consider Goodwin's classification inconsistent with pre-reservation cultural divisions.

Willem de Reuse finds linguistic evidence supporting only three major groupings: White Mountain, San Carlos, and Dilzhe'e (Tonto), with San Carlos as the most divergent dialect and Dilzhe'e a remnant intermediate member of a dialect continuum previously spanning the Western Apache language and Navajo.

== Personal life ==
In 1936 Goodwin met and married Janice "Jan" Thompson. They had one son, Neil.

During his lifetime, Goodwin had chronic tuberculosis, which then had no cure. Goodwin died in 1940 at the age of 32 in Los Angeles, from complications of a brain tumor. He was buried in Tucson, Arizona.

In 1988 the son Neil Goodwin directed a film documentary based on his father's study of the Apache. It was "Geronimo and the Apache Resistance" (1988), produced as an episode of the PBS series, The American Experience. In addition, Neil Goodwin has published two books on his father's work: The Apache Diaries: A Father–Son Journey (2002) and the collection, Like a Brother: Grenville Goodwin's Apache Years, 1929–1938 (2004).

== Legacy ==
The anthropologist Edward H. Spicer wrote of Goodwin, "His promising work was cut short, but even so he succeeded in laying the foundations of a sound ethnology of a people whom he had learned during ten years to understand and respect."

== Published ==
- Goodwin, Grenville (1994) [1939]. Myths and Tales of the White Mountain Apache. Tucson, Arizona: University of Arizona Press. 978-0-8165-1451-9.
- Goodwin, Grenville (1969) [1941]. Basso, Keith H (ed.). The Social Organization of the Western Apache. Tucson, Arizona: University of Arizona Press. LCCN 76-75453. OCLC 17996.
- Goodwin, Grenville (1971). Basso, Keith H (ed.). Western Apache Raiding and Warfare. Tucson, Arizona: University of Arizona Press. ISBN 0816502978. LCCN 73-142255, collection of memoirs by six Apache who lived before and during the reservation period, as well as explanatory material.
