= Sanskritisation =

Lower caste adoption of upper caste culture and values

Sanskritisation (or Sanskritization) is a process through which individuals or communities belonging to certain castes and tribal groups adopt the culture, values, lifestyles, and ritual practices of the dominant upper castes, with the aim of attaining upward social mobility and an elevated social status within the hierarchical structure of caste system of India. The phenomenon bears resemblance to the sociological concept of "passing". The term Sanskritisation was popularised in the 1950s by Indian sociologist and anthropologist M. N. Srinivas. (Note: Charsley 1998, citing Srinivas 1952)

Sanskritisation has in particular been observed among mid-ranked members within caste hierarchy. It is considered an aspect of the wider historical and cultural process of Brahmanisation, which is the assimilation or alignment of local and regional Indian religious traditions with Brahmanism, leading to the Hindu synthesis and the formation of Hinduism, through a syncretic blending of diverse beliefs and customs into the Brahmanical fold.

== Definition ==
Srinivas defined Sanskritisation as a process by which

a low or middle Hindu caste, or tribal or other group, changes its customs, ritual, ideology, and way of life in the direction of a high and frequently twice-born caste. Generally such changes are followed by a claim to a higher position in the caste hierarchy than that traditionally conceded to the claimant class by the local community..."

In a broader sense, Sanskritisation is

the process whereby local or regional forms of culture and religion – local deities, rituals, literary genres – become identified with the great tradition of Sanskrit literature and culture: namely the culture and religion of orthodox, Aryan, Brahmans, which accepts the Veda as revelation and, generally, adheres to varrṇāśrama-dharma.

In this process, local traditions (little traditions) become integrated into the great tradition of Brahmanical religion, disseminating Sanskrit texts and Brahmanical ideas throughout India, and abroad. This facilitated the development of the Hindu synthesis, in which the Brahmanical tradition absorbed local popular traditions of ritual and ideology.

According to Srinivas, Sanskritisation is not just the adoption of new customs and habits, but also includes exposure to new ideas and values appearing in Sanskrit literature. He says the words Karma, dharma, papa, maya, samsara, and moksha are the most common Sanskrit theological ideas which become common in the talk of people who are sanskritised.

== Development ==
Srinivas first propounded this theory in his D.Phil. thesis at Oxford. The thesis was later brought out as a book, which was an ethnographical study of the Kodava (Coorgs) community of Karnataka. Srinivas writes:

The caste system is far from a rigid system, in which the position of each component caste is fixed for all time. Movement has always been possible, and especially in the middle regions of the hierarchy. A caste was able, in a generation or two, to rise to a higher position in the hierarchy by adopting vegetarianism and teetotalism, and by Sanskritising its ritual and pantheon. In short, it took over, as far as possible, the customs, rites, and beliefs of the Brahmins, and adoption of the Brahminic way of life by a low caste seems to have been frequent, though theoretically forbidden. This process has been called ‘Sanskritisation’ in this book, in preference to ‘Brahminisation’, as certain Vedic rites are confined to the Brahmins and the two other twice-born castes.

The book challenged the then prevalent idea that caste was a rigid and unchanging institution. The concept of Sanskritisation addressed the actual complexity and fluidity of caste relations. It brought into academic focus the dynamics of the renegotiation of status by various castes and communities in India.

According to Jaffrelot 2005, p. 33, a similar heuristic was previously described by Ambedkar (1916, 1917). (Note: Jaffrelot 2005, p. 33 notes, "Ambedkar advanced the basis of one of the most heuristic of concepts in modern Indian Studies – the sanskritization process – that M.N. Srinivas 1952 was to introduce 40 years later.") Jaffrelot goes on to say, "While the term was coined by Srinivas, the process itself had been described by colonial administrators such as E. T. Atkinson in his Himalayan Gazetteer and Alfred Lyall, in whose works Ambedkar might well have encountered it."

Virginius Xaxa notes that sometimes the anthropologists also use the term Kshatriyisation and Rajputisation in place of Sanskritisation.

== Examples ==
Sanskritisation is often aimed to claim the Varna status of Brahmin or Kshatriyas, the two prestigious Varna of the Vedic-age Varna system. One of the main example of it is various non-elite pastoral communities like Ahir, Gopa, Ahar, Goala etc. who adopted the Yadav word as part of Sanskritisation effort to gain upward mobility in society during late 19th century to early 20th century. Similar attempts were made by communities who were historically classed as non-elite tillers like Kurmi and various communities like Koeri, Murao etc. from the late 19th century onwards through their caste organisations by claiming higher social status. Kalwar caste is traditionally involved into distillation and selling of liquor, but around the start of the 20th century, various organisations related to the caste sought to redefine the image of their community through this process.

Another example in North India is of Rajput. According to historical evidence, the present day Rajput community varies greatly in status, consisting of those with royal lineage to those whose ancestors were petty tenants or tribals who gained land and political power to justify their claim of being Kshatriya.

One clear example of Sanskritisation is the adoption, in emulation of the practice of twice-born castes, of vegetarianism by people belonging to the so-called low castes who are traditionally not averse to non-vegetarian food.

One more example is of Hindu Jat in rural North India who did Sanskritisation with the help of Arya Samaj as a part of a social upliftment effort.

An unsuccessful example is the Vishwakarma caste's claim to Brahmin status, which is not generally accepted outside that community, despite their adoption of some Brahmin caste traits, such as wearing the sacred thread, and the Brahminisation of their rituals. Srinivas juxtaposed the success of the Lingayat caste in achieving advancement within Karnataka society by such means with the failure of the Vishwakarma to achieve the same. Their position as a left-hand caste has not aided their ambition.

Srinivas was of the view that Sanskritisation was not limited to the Hindu castes, and stated that the semi-tribal groups including Himalayas's Pahadis, central India's Gonds and Oraons, and western India's Bhils also underwent Sanskritisation. He further suggested that, after going through Sanskritisation, such tribes would claim that they are castes and hence Hindus. This phenomenon has also been observed in Nepal among Khas, Magar, Newar, and Tharu people.

== Reception ==
Yogendra Singh has critiqued the theory as follows:

Sanskritisation fails to account for many aspects of cultural changes in the past and contemporary India as it neglects non-sanskritic traditions. It may be noted that often a non-sanskritic element of culture may be a localised form of sanskritic tradition. Sanskritic rites are often added to non-sanskritic rites without replacing them.

== See also ==
- De-Sanskritisation
- Acculturation
- The Battle for Sanskrit
- Islamization
- Kshatriyas and Would-be Kshatriyas
- List of Sanskrit universities in India
- Pāṇini
- Sanskrit cinema
- Sanskrit studies
- Shiksha
