= Kshatriyas and Would-be Kshatriyas =

1904 essay examining India's caste politics

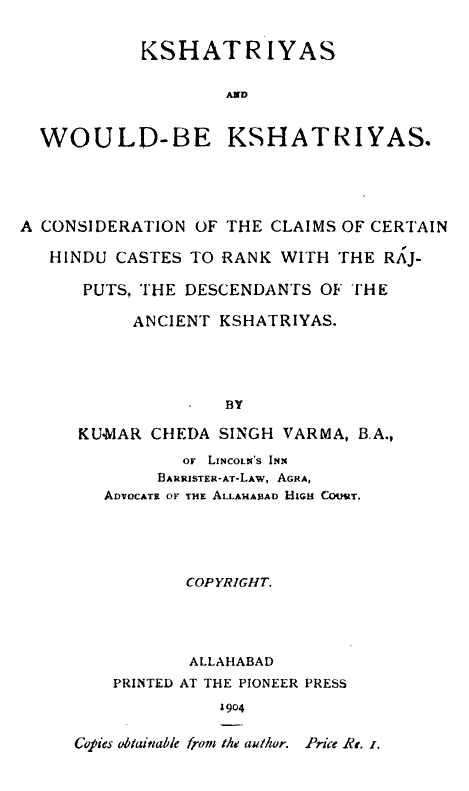
Frontispiece, 1904 edition

Kshatriyas and would-be Kshatriyas: a consideration of the claims of certain Hindu castes to rank with the Rájputs, the descendants of the ancient Kshatriyas was written by Kumar Cheda Singh Varma advocate at the Allahabad High Court. It was published in Allahabad at Pioneer Press in 1904. A Hindi translation, Kshatriya aur Kitram Kshatriya was made by Kumar Rupa Sinha and published in Agra at the Rajput Anglo-Oriental Press in 1907.

== Concept ==
The introduction to the book explains that it was written to examine the expressions of caste politics and Sanskritisation, which had become particularly notable following the 1901 census of India, which had attempted to classify the population into the four varna (ranks in the ritual social hierarchy) of Hinduism.

After more than a century of British rule and Western culture in India it is much to be regretted that so much importance still attaches, among the people of the country, to the question of caste; nay, it is even found that modern education and enlightenment are made, by certain sections of the community, to serve the purpose of advancing their respective claims. In these circumstances, no apology need be made for throwing some light on the origin and social position of some of these caste divisions of the Indian people. About three years ago the Census Commissioner in India (The Hon. Mr. H H. Risley, C.S, C.S.I.) directed that, for the Census of India, 1901, a scheme should be drawn up classifying the various Hindu castes under the four groups of Brahmans, Kshatriyas, Vaishyas, and Sudras; and assigning to each caste in these groups its proper position according to the order of social precedence The members of certain castes which have, hitherto, in an undefined sort of way, been striving to rise in the social scale eagerly seized the opportunity thus afforded them of having their pretensions to a higher status placed on record and, if possible, stamped with the hall-mark of official recognition.

== Reception ==
Statements of appreciation of Varma's work are stated in Gabrielle Festing's From the land of princes and the 1912 Journal of the Royal Society of Arts.
