= De-Sanskritisation =

Opposition to Sanskrit cultural influence

De-Sanskritisation is a term that denotes opposition to the cultural influence propagated through Sanskritisation.

== Background ==
The attempts at Sanskritisation by the lower-castes before the British rule were severely resisted by the upper-castes. During the British period, the process of sanskritisation saw a significant increase in frequency.

According to Jaffrelot, the formation of Caste associations was a by-product of enumeration of caste in censuses undertaken by the British regime. Herbert Hope Risley, a colonial administrator who served as the census commissioner, decided to categorise castes in their local context and rank them accordingly into a Varna. This led to the creation of advocacy groups that sought upward mobility of their social and Varna status through sanskritisation. In the late 19th century and 20th century, many Indian lower caste groups underwent sanskritisation in order to seek upward mobility to a high Varna status as that of Brahmins or Kshatriyas. The Castes such as Kurmis, Kachi, Jatavs, Lodhs, Kalwar, Ahirs underwent sanskritisation in order to recast themselves as Kshatriyas.

According to Owen Lynch:

The change is due to the fact that Sanskritization is no longer as effective a means as is political participation for achieving a change in style of life and a rise in the Indian social system, now composed of both caste and class elements. The ultimate object of Sanskritization was to open and legitimize a place in the opportunity and power structures of the caste society. It is hoped that the same objectives can now be achieved by active, but separatist, political participation. No longer is entrance into the power, opportunity, and wealth structures of Indian society based solely on ascribed caste status; in the public sector, at least, achievement based on citizen-ship status is the principle of recruitment to these structures.

The criticism of the Sanskritisation process by backward class intellectuals in post-independence led to its reversal through de-Sanskritization. In this process, backward classes strove to establish an autonomous identity, similar to the way Dalits did during the pre-independence period. Jagpal Singh notes:

In this process they replaced the high caste suffix with the names of their organizations and their title names, renamed their educational and other caste related institutions after the names of their caste icons and invented/discovered alternative cultural traditions/icons

The attempts at de-sanskritisation have been observed among several communities in order to gain the benefits provided by the Indian government to the scheduled caste communities.

== Prevalence ==
Anthropologist Dhirendra Nath Majumdar found de-Sanskritisation to be more prevalent than Sanskritisation. He also noted that lower castes were not moving towards the higher but the higher ones were abandoning their traditional life style.

After initially becoming the followers of the Arya Samaj, some of the Dalits began the process of de-Sanskritisation after questioning the Arya Samaj and Sanskritisation thesis. In the period following independence, de-Sanskritization became a key feature among Dalits who sought an alternative cultural identity. In Rajasthan and Western UP, backward class public intellectuals blamed the backwardness of their caste on earlier leadership, which, under the influence of Arya Samaj, had failed to dissociate itself from the process of Sanskritisation, as well as had been unable to assert a distinct identity from that of upper-caste people.

The Sanamahi movement took place after the death of Laininghal Naoriya Phulo to support the de-Sanskritisation of Meetei culture and revival of their heritage. This movement opposed any links to the Indo-Aryan heritage.

=== Linguistics ===
The de-Sanskritisation of Tamil started during the 1950s following the popularization of Dravidianism. These attempts at "de-sanskritization" came to see the language having altered to remove a lot of the Sanskrit borrowing.

The Hela Havula movement advocated de-Sanskritisation of the Sinhala language.
