= Supaṇṇa Saṃyutta =

30th Samyutta in the Samyutta Nikaya of Pali Canon

The Supaṇṇa Saṃyutta is a Buddhist scripture of the Pali Canon. It is the 30th Saṃyutta in the Saṃyutta Nikāya, placed in the Khandha Vaggasaṃyutta.

== Content ==
The Supaṇṇa Saṃyutta, also known as the Linked Discourses on Phoenixes, provides basic accounts of the nature of the garuḍas; avian deities in Buddhist mythology. The Buddha describes these beings in regards to their mode of birth, hierarchy, as well as the reasons one may be reborn among them.

=== Suttas ===
A total of forty-six suttas are found in the text. Suttas 4–6, 7-16 and 17-46 are each abbreviated into a single discourse.

1) Suddhika Sutta
2) Haranti Sutta
3) Dvayakārī Sutta
4-6) Dutiyādidvayakārīsuttattika
7-16) Aṇḍajadānūpakārasuttadasaka
17-46) Jalābujadānūpakārasuttattiṃsaka

== English translations ==
- Sutta Central: Bhikkhu Sujato
- Mettanet Tipitaka Index: Bhikkuni Uppalavanna

== See also ==
- Sutta Pitaka
