= Morris Edward Opler =

American anthropologist (1907–1996)

- Born: May 16, 1907; Buffalo, New York
- Died: May 13, 1996 (aged 88)
- Education: University of Chicago
- Relatives: Marvin Opler (brother)
- Scientific career
- Fields: Anthropology
- Workplaces: Reed College; Claremont Colleges; Cornell University; University of Oklahoma

Morris Edward Opler (May 16, 1907 – May 13, 1996) was an American anthropologist and advocate of Japanese-American civil rights. He was born in Buffalo, New York and was the older brother of Marvin Opler, an anthropologist and social psychiatrist.

Opler's chief anthropological contribution was in the ethnography of Southern Athabaskan peoples, i.e. the Navajo and Apache, such as the Chiricahua, Mescalero, Lipan, and Jicarilla. His classic work is An Apache Life-Way (1941). He worked with Grenville Goodwin, who was also studying social organization among the Western Apache. Following Goodwin's death, Opler edited a volume of his letters from the field and other papers and published the collection in 1973.

Opler earned his Ph.D. from the University of Chicago in 1933. He taught at Reed College in Portland, Oregon, and the Claremont Colleges in Claremont, California, during the 1940s. Later, he taught at Cornell University and the University of Oklahoma.

During World War II, Opler worked as a community analyst at the Manzanar concentration camp, documenting conditions in the camp and the daily lives of its Japanese-American inmates. Arriving in 1943, he was sympathetic toward the displaced Japanese Americans and frequently butted heads with camp administrators. He covered the so-called "Manzanar Riot," resistance to the unpopular "loyalty questionnaire," and conscription of men from the camp.

He also aided the defense of Gordon Hirabayashi and Fred Korematsu in their unsuccessful cases challenging the legality of the exclusion of Japanese Americans from the West Coast. Opler wrote an amicus brief for each case that argued the military necessity cited by Western Defense Command head John L. DeWitt was in fact, based "on racial grounds."

In his published works, he challenged the way American public schools taught about Japanese Americans, and fought to improve the way they were viewed by Americans.

== Early life ==
Opler was born in Buffalo in 1907 to German-Jewish parents who were immigrants from Austria. His family attended Temple Ben Zion, a Reform synagogue in Buffalo, but were not particularly religious.

== Notable accomplishments ==
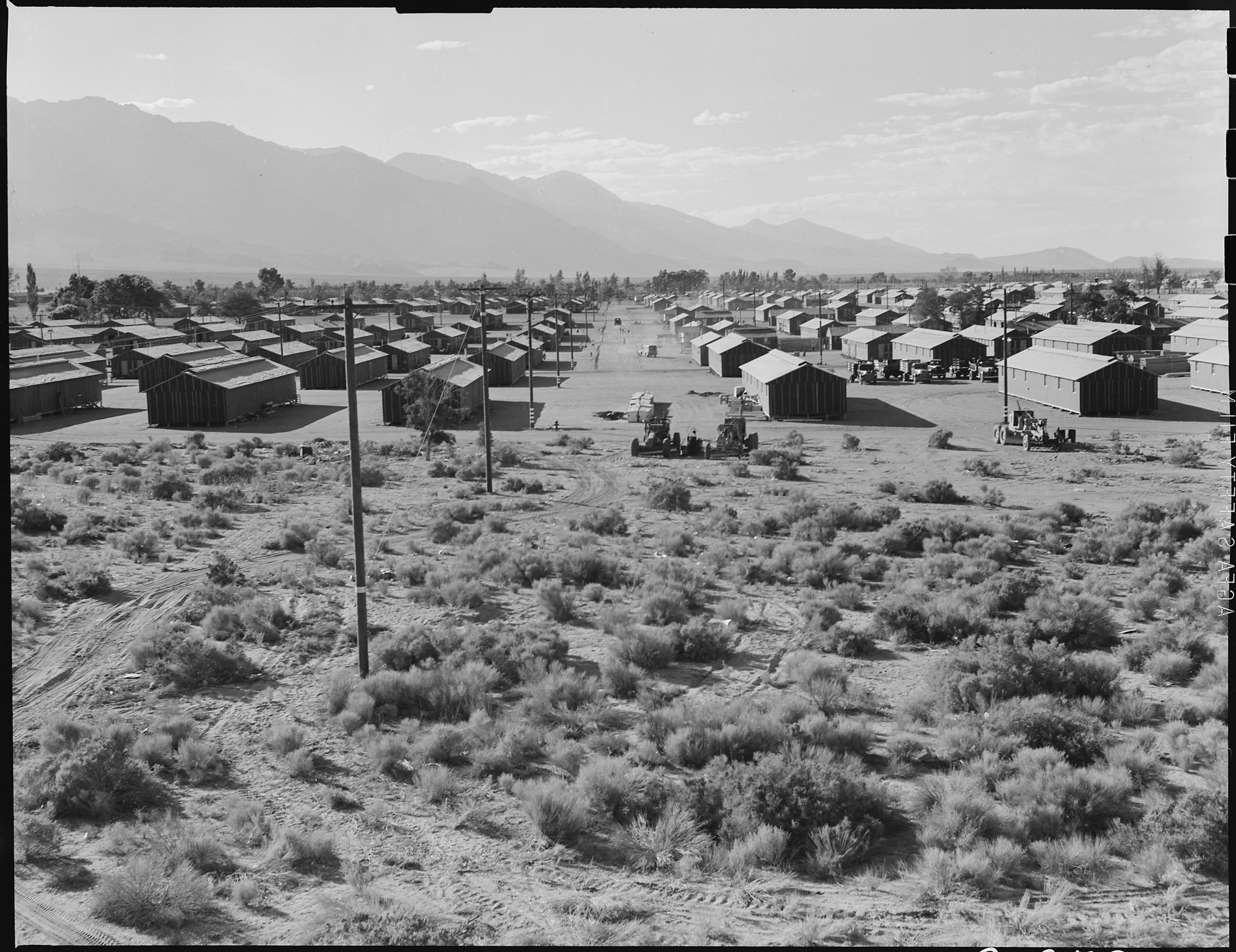
Manzanar Relocation Center

Morris Edward Opler was an anthropologist focusing on Native American and Japanese-American anthropology. After earning a bachelor's degree and a master's degree from the University at Buffalo, he received his doctorate from the University of Chicago. His dissertation, entitled "An Analysis of Mescalero and Chiricahua Apache Social Organization in the Light of Their Systems of Relationships," was presented in 1932.

In 1942, while Opler was working at Claremont College, he was awarded a Fellowship grant from the John Simon Guggenheim Memorial Foundation for his research among the Apache people during the decade prior.

In 1943, Opler began working with the American Office of War Information, doing anthropological work with the Japanese Americans kept in concentration camps during World War II (more specifically in the Manzanar War Relocation Center) as a result of the United States government's distrust of Japanese loyalty to America. Opler wrote several legal briefs on behalf of Japanese American individuals, two of which were heard by the United States Supreme Court. In part because of Opler's work, the Supreme Court ruled in 1945 that the Japanese internees were being held and treated unconstitutionally.

In 1949, Opler returned to New York and accepted a position at Cornell University. During his twenty years there, he established a program dedicated to Asian Studies.

== Career path ==
Morris Edward Opler’s work spanned nearly 50 years. In 1931, he began doing anthropological fieldwork in New Mexico with the Mescalero Apache tribe. He had a lifelong interest in the indigenous people of western America, specifically the Apache, and consistently focused his studies on their lifestyles and practices.

Opler became a professor at Reed College in 1937; he later taught at Claremont College, Harvard University, Cornell University, and the University of Oklahoma. Between these academic positions, Opler worked for the Office of War Information (1943–1946) and at the Manzanar War Relocation Center during WWII. In 1953, he participated in a research project related to villages near Lucknow with Indian anthropologist D.N. Majumdar. After retiring from the University of Oklahoma in 1977, he dedicated his time to writing and publishing articles on Apache life.

== Views and beliefs ==
Opler had strong beliefs and opinions, and he was not afraid to make them known. He fought back in writing, often harshly and in a way that excited opposition, against those he disagreed with.

Opler was interested in Jewish causes, but was not a Zionist. He referred to Zionism as "very unacceptable and narrow". He believed support for Zionism was motivated in part by antisemitism, stating that "Israel was sanctioned by the Allies partly because of mingling, because they didn’t want to open their doors to Jews. They concentrated themselves instead in Israel."

Politically, he had an aversion to Marxist and Communist ideals and spoke out against them. He lived in a time when the United States was experiencing widespread paranoia surrounding Marxism, and anthropologists were often the group found most guilty of engaging in Marxist mindsets and practices.

Anthropologically, he believed in observing cultural practices and beliefs without judgment or bias (a practice known as cultural relativity). He defended the people he studied. For example, while he was working at the Manzanar War Relocation Center, he showed great sympathy for the Japanese people who were kept there. He was a strong advocate for their rights and comfort while he studied and wrote about their culture.

Opler believed that studies of culture should be independent of studies of biology. He believed that the unchanging nature of human biology and the constant evolution of culture would contradict each other if attempts were made to study them in tandem. Because of this belief that differences in culture didn't come from differences in biology, Opler was racially tolerant and didn't believe one race was biologically superior. This racial tolerance would lead him to dedicate so much of his research efforts to marginalized ethnic groups, namely the Native Americans and the Japanese.

== Famous publications ==
A majority of Opler's research was done on Native American groups of the American Southwest. He studied specifically the Chiricahua Indians, who were the subjects of his two most famous books, An Apache Life-Way and Myths and Tales of the Chiricahua Apache Indians.

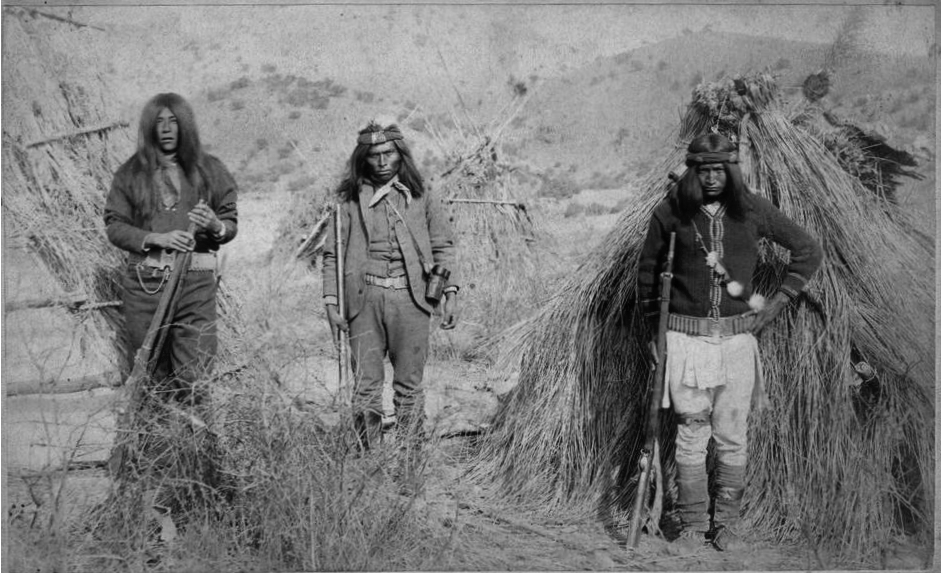
Apache Warriors

An Apache Life-Way: The Economic, Social, and Religious Institutions of the Chiricahua Indians was one of Opler's most famous publications. He studied many Native American groups, but the Apache were his main focus. The book goes through the life of an Apache year by year. Rather than a history, this book explains the day-to-day Apache experience, going in chronological order of one's life. The lifestyle described in the book is from a time before the Americans started the long era of hostile interactions with the Apache.

The people designated as "Apache" in this book are those who spoke the Apache language in the area that is now New Mexico, Arizona, Sonora, and Chihuahua. Many smaller sub-groups populated these areas, three of those being different groups of the Chiricahua Apache.

The book is divided into several main parts: Childhood; Maturation; Social Relations of Adults; Folk Beliefs, Medical Practice, and Shamanism; Maintenance of the Household; Marital and Sexual Life; The Round of Life; Political Organization and Status; and Death, Mourning, and the Underworld. Each section is divided into more specific subcategories that explore each phase of life and the rituals associated with it.

In Myths and Tales of the Chiricahua Apache Indians Opler describes the mythology and beliefs of the Chiricahua Apache. It contains religious stories, as well as historical tales, passed down for generations by the Apache. Opler believed that studying the mythology of a people was one of the best ways to understand the roots of their culture. With each of the peoples he studied throughout his career as an anthropologist, he made an effort to become familiar with the folklore of the people.

The book is divided into six main parts, each containing several subcategories and chapters: When the Earth Was New; The Contest for Daylight; The Coyote Cycle and Other Animal, Bird, and Insect Tales; Stories of Supernatural Beings and Encounters with Supernaturals; Stories of Foolish People, Unfaithfulness, and Perversion; and Miscellaneous.

While writing these books, he interviewed several Apache in order to get the truth from their perspective. He consulted with them on the contents of the books and spent a lot of time with them in order to better understand their culture before publishing about it.

== See also ==
- Native American–Jewish relations

== Selected works ==
- Basso, Keith H.; & Opler, Morris E. (Eds.). (1971). Apachean culture history and ethnology. Anthropological papers of the University of Arizona (No. 21). Tucson: University of Arizona Press.
- Castetter, Edward F.; & Opler, Morris E. (1936). The Ethnobiology of the Chiricahua and Mescalero Apache: The Use of Plants for Foods, Beverages and Narcotics, Ethnobiological studies in the American Southwest, (Vol. 3); Biological series (Vol. 4, No. 5); Bulletin, University of New Mexico, whole, (No. 297). Albuquerque: University of New Mexico Press.
- Goodwin, Grenville; & Opler, Morris E. (1973). Grenville Goodwin among the Western Apache: Letters from the Field. Tucson: University of Arizona Press. ISBN 978-0-8165-0417-6.
- Hoijer, Harry; & Opler, Morris E. (1938). Chiricahua and Mescalero Apache Texts. The University of Chicago Publications in Anthropology; Linguistic series. Chicago: University of Chicago Press. (Reprinted 1964 by Chicago: University of Chicago Press; in 1970 by Chicago: University of Chicago Press; & in 1980 under H. Hoijer by New York: AMS Press, ISBN 978-0-404-15783-8).
- Opler, Morris E. (1932). An Analysis of Mescalero and Chiricahua Apache Social Organization in the Light of Their Systems of Relationship. (Unpublished doctoral dissertation, University of Chicago)
- Opler, Morris E (1935). "The Concept of Supernatural Power among the Chiricahua and Mescalero Apaches". American Anthropologist. 37 (1): 65–70. doi:10.1525/aa.1935.37.1.02a00060.
- Opler, Morris E (1936). "The kinship systems of the Southern Athabaskan-speaking tribes". American Anthropologist. 38 (4): 620–633. doi:10.1525/aa.1936.38.4.02a00120.
- Opler, Morris E. (1937). "An Outline of Chiricahua Apache Social Organization", In F. Egan (Ed.), Social Anthropology of North American Tribes (pp. 173–242). Chicago: University of Chicago Press.
- Opler, Morris E (1938). "A Chiricahua Apache Account of the Geronimo Campaign of 1886". New Mexico Historical Review. 13: 4.
- Opler, Morris E. (1938). "Myths and Tales of the Jicarilla Apache Indians", Memoirs of the American Folklore Society (No. 31). New York.
- Opler, Morris E (1938). "The Use of Peyote by the Carrizo and the Lipan Apache". American Anthropologist. 40: 2. doi:10.1525/aa.1938.40.2.02a00080.
- Opler, Morris E. (1940). Myths and Legends of the Lipan Apache. Memoirs of the American Folklore Society (Vol. 36). New York: American Folklore Society, J. J. Augustin.
- Opler, Morris E. (1941). An Apache Life-way: The Economic, Social, and Religious Institutions of the Chiricahua Indians. Chicago: The University of Chicago Press. (Reprinted 1962 by Chicago: University of Chicago Press; 1965 by New York: Cooper Square Publishers; 1965 by Chicago: University of Chicago Press; & 1994 by Lincoln: University of Nebraska Press, ISBN 978-0-8032-8610-8).
- Opler, Morris E (1942). "The Identity of the Apache Mansos". American Anthropologist. 44 (4): 725. doi:10.1525/aa.1942.44.4.02a00290.
- Opler, Morris E. (1942). Myths and Tales of the Chiricahua Apache Indians. Memoirs of the American Folklore Society (No. 37). New York: American Folklore Society.
- Opler, Morris E (1944). "The Jicarilla Apache Ceremonial Relay Race". American Anthropologist. 46 (1): 75–97. doi:10.1525/aa.1944.46.1.02a00060.
- Opler, Morris E (1945). "The Lipan Apache Death Complex and Its Extensions". Southwestern Journal of Anthropology. 1 (1): 122–141. doi:10.1086/soutjanth.1.1.3628786. S2CID 163365717.
- Opler, Morris E (1945). "Themes as Dynamic Forces in Culture". American Journal of Sociology. 51 (3): 198–206. doi:10.1086/219787. S2CID 144973768.
- Opler, Morris E. (1946). The Creative Role of Shamanism in Mescalero Apache Mythology.
- Opler, Morris E. (1946). Childhood and Youth in Jicarilla Apache Society. Los Angeles: The Southwest Museum.
- Opler, Morris E. (1947). Mythology and Folk Belief in the Maintenance of Jicarilla Apache Tribal Endogamy.
- Opler, Morris E (1959). "Component, assemblage, and theme in cultural integration and differentiation". American Anthropologist. 61 (6): 955–964. doi:10.1525/aa.1959.61.6.02a00040.
- Opler, Morris E (1961). "Cultural evolution, Southern Athapaskans, and chronology in theory". Southwestern Journal of Anthropology. 17 (1): 1–20. doi:10.1086/soutjanth.17.1.3628864. S2CID 130657637.
- Opler, Morris E (1962). "Two converging lines of influence in cultural evolutionary theory". American Anthropologist. 64 (3): 524–547. doi:10.1525/aa.1962.64.3.02a00050.
- Opler, Morris E (1964). "The human being in culture theory". American Anthropologist. 66 (3): 507–528. doi:10.1525/aa.1964.66.3.02a00010.
- Opler, Morris E (1968). "Remuneration to supernaturals and man in Apachean ceremonialism". Ethnology. 7 (4): 356–393. doi:10.2307/3773016. JSTOR 3773016.
- Opler, Morris E. (1969). Apache odyssey: A journey between two worlds. New York: Holt, Rinehart & Winston.
- Opler, Morris E (1969). "Western Apache and Kiowa Apache materials relating to ceremonial payment". Ethnology. 8 (1): 122–124. doi:10.2307/3772941. JSTOR 3772941.
- Opler, Morris E. (1971). "Pots, Apache, and the Dismal River culture aspect", In K. H. Basso & M. E. Opler (Eds.) (pp. 29–33).
- Opler, Morris E (1975). "Problems in Apachean cultural history, with special reference to the Lipan Apache". Anthropological Quarterly. 48 (3): 182–192. doi:10.2307/3316923. JSTOR 3316923.
- Opler, Morris E (1975). "Applied anthropology and the Apache". Papers in Anthropology. 16 (4): 1–77.
- Opler, Morris E. (1983). The Apachean culture pattern and its origins. In A. Ortiz (Ed.), Handbook of North American Indians: Southwest (Vol. 10, pp. 368–392). Washington, D.C.: Smithsonian Institution.
- Opler, Morris E. (1983). Chiricahua Apache. In A. Ortiz (Ed.), Handbook of North American Indians: Southwest (Vol. 10, pp. 401–418). Washington, D.C.: Smithsonian Institution.
- Opler, Morris E. (1983). Mescalero Apache. In A. Ortiz (Ed.), Handbook of North American Indians: Southwest (Vol. 10, pp. 419–439). Washington, D.C.: Smithsonian Institution.
- Opler, Morris E. (2001). Lipan Apache. In R. J. DeMallie (Ed.), Handbook of North American Indians: Plains (Vol. 13, pp. 941–952). Washington, D.C.: Smithsonian Institution.
- Opler, Morris E; Bittle, William E (1961). "The death practices and eschatology of the Kiowa Apache". Southwestern Journal of Anthropology. 17 (4): 383–394. doi:10.1086/soutjanth.17.4.3628949. S2CID 164093581.
- Opler, Morris E.; & French, David H. (1941). Myths and tales of the Chiricahua Apache Indians. Memoirs of the American Folklore Society, (Vol. 37). New York: American Folklore Society. (Reprinted in 1969 by New York: Kraus Reprint Co.; in 1970 by New York; in 1976 by Millwood, NY: Kraus Reprint Co.; & in 1994 under M. E. Opler, Morris by Lincoln: University of Nebraska Press. ISBN 978-0-8032-8602-3).
- Opler, Morris E.; Hoijer, Harry (1940). "The raid and war-path language of the Chiricahua Apache". American Anthropologist. 42 (4): 617–634. doi:10.1525/aa.1940.42.4.02a00070.
- Webster, Anthony K (2000). "Morris Edward Opler (1907–1996)". American Anthropologist. 102 (2): 328–329. doi:10.1525/aa.2000.102.2.328.
