= Dhirendra Nath Majumdar =

Indian anthropologist (1903–1960)

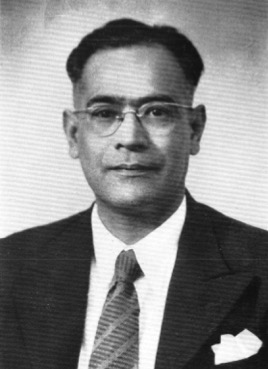
- Born: 3 June 1903; Dhaka
- Died: 31 May 1960 (aged 56)
- Occupation: Anthropologist

Dhirendra Nath Majumdar (3 June 1903 – 31 May 1960) was an Indian anthropologist. He specialized in both the physical and cultural branches of anthropology, conducting extensive fieldwork and serological research across various communities in India.

== Early life ==
Dhirendra Nath Majumdar was born on 3 June 1903 into the zamindar family of the Kushumhaty estate in present-day Dhaka, Bangladesh. He was the second child of Rebati Mohan Majumdar and Kushum Kumari.

He completed his matriculation at Dacca Government College. He did his undergraduate studies at University College, Calcutta, and later earned an M.A. in anthropology from the University of Calcutta in 1924 and a Ph.D. from the University of Cambridge in 1935.

== Career ==
Majumdar began his academic career in 1928 when he joined Lucknow University as a lecturer in anthropology. Following his doctoral studies in England, he returned to Lucknow University and was appointed as the head of the anthropology department in 1951.

During his time in England, he became acquainted with the prominent anthropologist Malinowski and was also significantly influenced by the written works of Ruth Benedict.

Throughout his career, Majumdar was appointed to various prominent organizational roles and academic bodies:

- In 1939, he served as the president of the Anthropology Section of the Indian Science Congress.
- He was elected as a fellow of the National Institute of India starting in 1941.
- Between 1952 and 1953, he participated in an anthropological seminar in the United States organized by the Wenner-Gren Foundation. During this period, he also delivered lectures as a guest speaker at Cornell University.
- In 1954, he was chosen by the United Nations to serve as a member at the World Population Conference held in Rome.
- In 1956, he presided over a specific section of the International 'Human Relations' Conference in The Hague.

In 1951, he founded and headed the Department of Anthropology at the University of Lucknow. He was also a visiting professor at Cornell University and collaborated with Professor M.E. Opler on a research project. In his final years, he was the Dean of the Faculty of Arts at the University of Lucknow.

== Research and fieldwork ==
Majumdar's specialized training allowed him to integrate physical and cultural methodologies to study human lineages and societies. He carried out detailed serological and anthropometric surveys among the populations of Uttar Pradesh, Gujarat, Bengal, Madhya Pradesh, and Bihar.

To conduct deep ethnographic studies, Majumdar lived directly among various primitive tribal groups, including the Ho, Khasa, Korwa, Tharu, Gond, and Bhil. His research heavily focused on how external, non-tribal human societies influenced indigenous ways of life, alongside an academic evaluation of rural sectors. He published extensively on wide-ranging themes, including demography, serology, physical development, cultural dynamics, and urban social structures.

== Death ==
He died on 1 April 1960, due to a cerebral hemorrhage.

== Works ==
Majumdar's published literature includes numerous essays, papers, and books detailing the descriptive and physical traits of human groups:

- A Tribe in Transition (1937) – His debut book, featuring an analytical investigation of the human body.
- Ho (1937) and Khas (1962) – Celebrated monographs exploring these specific tribal groups from a cultural anthropology lens.
- The Fortunes of Primitive Tribes (1944)
- Races and Cultures of India (1944)
- Anthropometric Survey of the United Provinces (1949) – Co-authored alongside P. C. Mahalanobis and C. R. Rao.
- Race Realities in Cultural Gujarat (1950)
- The Affairs of a Tribe: Study in Tribal Dynamics (1950)
- Race Realities in Cultural Gujarat: Report on the Anthropometric Serological and Health Survey of Mahagujarat (1950)
- The Santhal: A Study in Cultural Range (1956)
- Caste and Communication in an Indian Village (1958)
- An Introduction to Social Anthropology (1961) – Co-authored alongside T. N. Madan.
- Majumdar, Dhirendra Nath (1950). The affairs of a tribe; a study in tribal dynamics. Lucknow: Published for the Ethnographic and Folk Culture Society, U.P., by Universal Publishers. OCLC 3079216.
- Majumdar, D.N. (1944). The Fortunes of Primitive Tribes. Pub. under the direction of the Superintendent, Provincial census operations, United provinces, 1941, for the Lucknow university by the Universal publishers, Limited.
- Majumdar, Dhirendra Nath (1947). The matrix of Indian culture. Lucknow: Published for Nagpur University by Universal Publishers. OCLC 3068227.
- Mahalanobis, P. C.; Majumdar, D. N.; Yeatts, M. W. M.; Rao, C. Radhakrishna (1949). "Anthropometric Survey of the United Provinces, 1941: A Statistical Study". Sankhyā: The Indian Journal of Statistics (1933-1960). 9 (2/3). Springer: 89–324. ISSN 0036-4452. JSTOR 25047983.
- Majumdar, Dhirendra Nath (1950). Race realities in cultural Gujarat; report on the anthropometric, serological and health survey of Maha Gujarat. Bombay: Gujarat Research Society. OCLC 3084490.
- Majumdar, D.N.; Madan, T.N. (1961). An Introduction to Social Anthropology. Asia Publishing House.
- Majumdar, D.N. (1958). Caste and Communication in an Indian Village. Asia Publishing House.
- Majumdar, D.N. (1960). Social Contours of an Industrial City: Social Survey of Kanpur, 1954-56. Asia Publishing House.
- Majumdar, D.N.; Rao, C.R. (1960). Race Elements in Bengal: A Quantitative Study. Indian statistical series. Asia Publishing House.
- Majumdar, D.N. (1962). Himalayan Polyandry, Structure, Functioning and Culture Change: A Field-study of Jaunsar-Bawar. Asia Publishing House.
