= The Collation and Annotation of Saṃyuktāgama =

Buddhist text

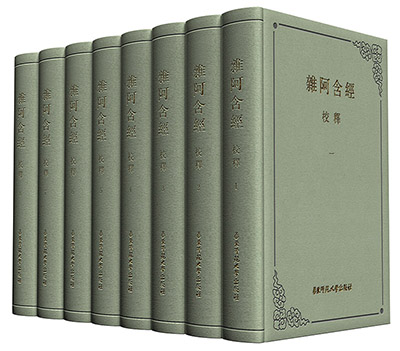
- Author: Wang Jianwei, Jin Hui
- Language: Chinese
- Publisher: East China Normal University Press
- Publication date: July 2014
- Pages: 3720
- ISBN: 978-7-5675-0534-6

The Collation and Annotation of Saṃyuktāgama is a Chinese translation and collection of Sarvastivada Buddhist texts.

The text was compiled by Wang Jianwei and Jin Hui over more than fourteen years, and consists of 4 parts, 7 chapters, 56 samyuktas and 8491 sutras, divided into 3 categories: sutra, geya and vyakarana. The authors also included annotations to clarify the text.

This work was a funded project by Shanghai Publishing Funds in 2013. It won first prize in both the 2014 National Excellent Ancient Book Award and the 2014 Excellent Ancient Book Award in East China in 2014, and is the first prize winner of the 14th Shanghai Book Award.

== Background ==
During the Early Buddhist period, the Theravada and Sarvastivada schools were the most influential. In Sri Lanka and South India the Tipitaka and notes and commentaries of Theravada were more prevalent, however in China, North India, and Southeast Asia the extant texts of Sarvastivada were more prevalent.

The Chinese Samyuktagama is an early version of Sarvastivada texts, which was brought from Sri Lanka by Faxian and translated by the eminent Indian monk Guṇabhadra (394–468). It is the only one of the northern four Agamas to be originally written in Sanskrit.

However, over time the Chinese Samyuktagama was downgraded due to its Hinayana status. Over time its sequence was disarranged and scrolls were lost and it became incomplete. Coupled with inaccurate transcription and an inaccurate complement, thus the Chinese Samyuktagama became difficult to read.

== The Book ==
The authors based their work on previous research done by Lucheng, Yinshun, and other scholars. Other referenced works included the translations by Xuanzang (602–664) and Yijing, Tripitaka Koreana (used as the master copy), Fangshan Stone carving Tripitaka, and Zhaocheng Jin Tripitaka. Referenced Pali works included Southern Pali Tipitaka, Northern Matika, various editions of Agama, Sarvastivada Abhidharma, and Sarvastivada Vinayapitaka.

According to the authors, their translation and compilation have three major achievements.

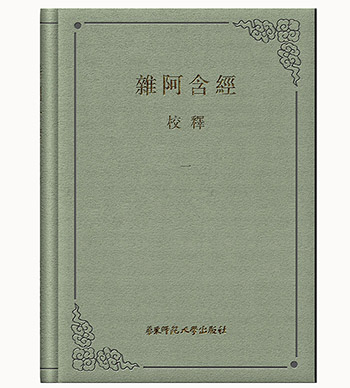

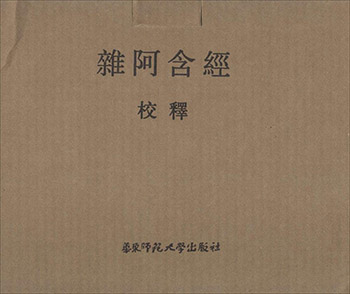

The first is that they compiled the text into categories, retrieved lost sections of the text, and reordered the text. They corrected errors made in previous translations. Two lost scrolls from Pali Canon were translated to make the text more complete.

The second is that the Chinese version of the text was collated with the Pali Canon. Ancient texts were annotated with ancient texts.

The third achievement is that southern versions of the texts were compared with the northern versions to determine their common source.

== Authors ==
Wang Jianwei (born 1958) and Jin Hui (b. 1971) graduated from East China Normal University and learned the Pāli Canon from Ven. Prof. Dhammadinna at University of Kelaniya Sri Lanka. Since 2000 they have also established Āgamārāma and published works in China and abroad. Their works include Chronicle of Zen Master Laiguo, and The True Meaning of Life.

== Gallery ==
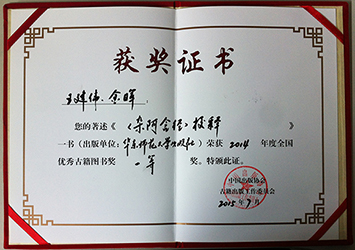

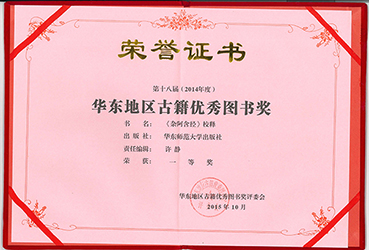

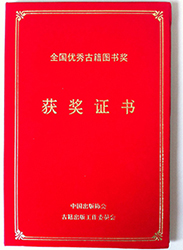
