= Rhys Davids =

Rhys Davids as a surname may refer to:

- Thomas William Rhys Davids, British scholar, founder and president of the Pāli Text Society, husband of next
- Caroline Augusta Foley Rhys Davids, British scholar, second president of the Pāli Text Society, wife of previous
- Arthur Rhys Davids, British ace of World War I, son of previous couple
