= Middle Indo-Aryan languages =

Historical group of Indo-Aryan languages from 600 BCE to 1000 CE

Middle Indo-Aryan
- Middle Indic
- Geographic distribution: Northern India
- Linguistic classification: Indo-European: Indo-Iranian; Indo-Aryan; Middle Indo-Aryan

Language codes
- Glottolog: midd1350

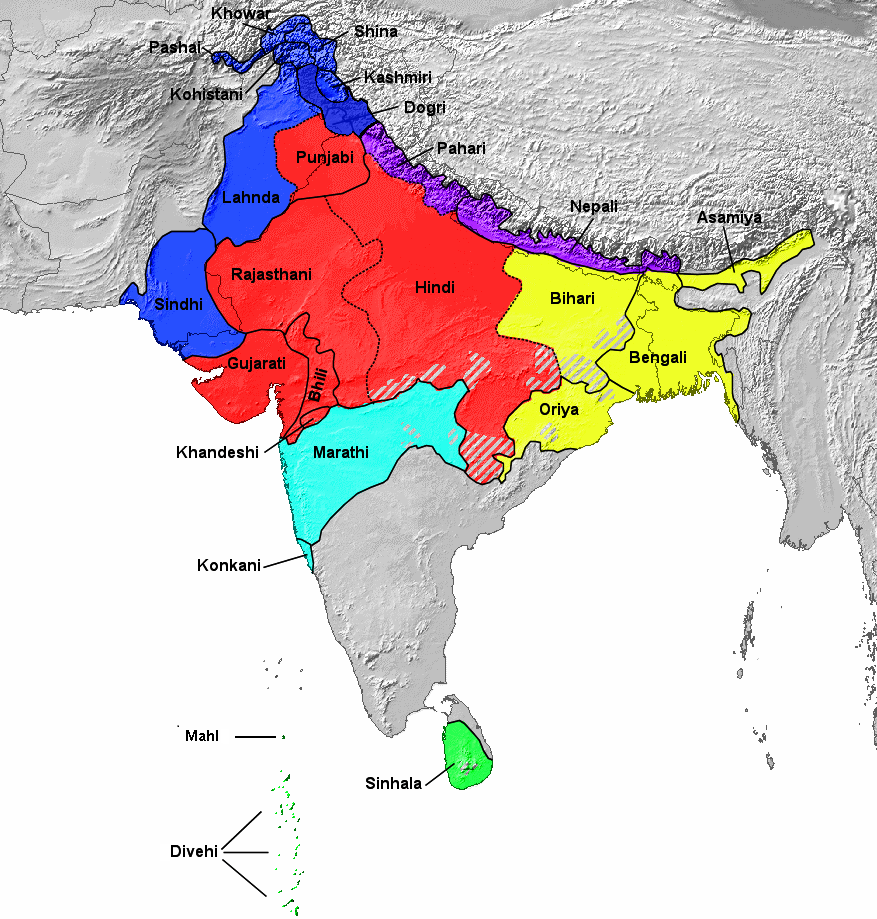
1978 map showing Indo-Aryan languages, grouping according to SIL Ethnologue

The Middle Indo-Aryan languages (or Middle Indic languages, sometimes conflated with the Prakrits, which are a stage of Middle Indic) are a historical group of languages of the Indo-Aryan family. They are the descendants of Old Indo-Aryan (OIA; attested through Vedic Sanskrit) and the predecessors of the modern Indo-Aryan languages, such as Hindustani (Hindi-Urdu), Bengali and Punjabi.

The Middle Indo-Aryan (MIA) stage is thought to have spanned more than a millennium between 600 BCE and 1000 CE, and is often divided into three major subdivisions.

- The early stage is represented by the Ardhamagadhi of the Edicts of Ashoka (c. 250 BCE) and Jain Agamas, and by the Pali of the Tripitakas.
- The middle stage is represented by the various literary Prakrits, especially the Shauraseni language and the Maharashtri and Magadhi Prakrits. The term Prakrit is also often applied to Middle Indo-Aryan languages (prākṛta literally means 'natural' as opposed to saṃskṛta, which literally means 'constructed' or 'refined'). Modern scholars such as Michael C. Shapiro follow this classification by including all Middle Indo-Aryan languages under the rubric of "Prakrits", while others emphasise the independent development of these languages, often separated from Sanskrit by social and geographic differences.
- The late stage is represented by the Apabhraṃśas of the 6th century CE and later that preceded early Modern Indo-Aryan languages (such as Braj Bhasha).

== History ==
The Indo-Aryan languages are commonly assigned to three major groups: Old Indo-Aryan languages, Middle Indo-Aryan languages and Early Modern and Modern Indo-Aryan languages. The classification reflects stages in linguistic development, rather than being strictly chronological.

The Middle Indo-Aryan languages are younger than the Old Indo-Aryan languages but were contemporaneous with the use of Classical Sanskrit, an Old Indo-Aryan language used for literary purposes.

According to Thomas Oberlies, a number of morphophonological and lexical features of Middle Indo-Aryan languages show that they are not direct continuations of Vedic Sanskrit. Instead they descend from other dialects similar to, but in some ways more archaic than Vedic Sanskrit.

=== Early phase (3rd century BCE) ===
- Ashokan Prakrits (regional dialects of the 3rd century BCE)
- Gandhari (a Buddhist canonical language)
- Pali (a Buddhist canonical language)
- Early Ardhamagadhi (language of the oldest Jain sutras)
- Elu (an ancient Sri Lankan Prakrit. It was ancestral to the Sinhalese and Dhivehi languages.)

=== Middle phase (200 BCE to 700 CE) ===
- Monumental Prakrit
- Niya Prakrit
- Ardhamagadhi (later Jain canon)
- Dramatic Prakrits (Maurya period)
  - Magadhi
  - Maharashtri
  - Shauraseni
- Sinhalese Prakrit
- Buddhist Hybrid Sanskrit (later texts)

=== Late phase: Apabhraṃśa (700–1200) ===
- Abahatta (Magadhi Apabhraṃśa)

== General characteristics ==
The following phonological changes distinguish typical MIA languages from their OIA ancestors:

1. The replacement of vocalic liquids ṛ and ḷ by a, i or u
2. The OIA diphthongs ai and au became the monophthongs e and o which were long in open syllables and short in closed syllables.
3. Long vowels become short in overweight and later pre/post-tonic heavy syllables.
4. The three sibilants of OIA are reduced to one, either ś (Magadhi) or s (elsewhere).
5. OIA clusters either became geminates through assimilation (deletion if the output would violate phonotactics) or were split by vowel epenthesis.
6. Initially, intervocalic aspirated stops spirantised. Later, all other intervocalic stops were deleted, weakened, or voiced.
7. Dentals (and sometimes retroflexes) are palatalised if directly preceding /j/.
8. Most final consonants delete except in sandhi junctions. Final m became ṃ instead, which was preserved.

Note that not all of these changes happened in all MIA languages. Archaisms persisted in northwestern Ashokan Prakrits like the retention of all 3 OIA sibilants, for example, retentions that would remain in the later Dardic languages.

The following morphological changes distinguish typical MIA languages from their OIA ancestors:

1. The dual number in nominal declensions was lost.
2. Consonantal stems were thematicised.
3. The i-/u- and ī-/ū- declensions were merged into one ī-/ū- declension.
4. The dative was eliminated and the genitive took on its former functions.
5. Many different case-endings could be used for one verbal paradigm.
6. The middle voice eventually disappeared.
7. mahyaṃ and tuhyaṃ became used for genitives and me and te for instrumentals.
8. New verbal forms based on the present stem coexisted with fossilised forms from OIA.
9. Active endings replaced passive endings for the passive voice.

A Middle Indo-Aryan innovation are the serial verb constructions that have evolved into complex predicates in modern north Indian languages such as Hindi and Bengali. For example, भाग जा (bhāg jā) 'go run' means run away, पका ले (pakā le) 'take cook' means to cook for oneself, and पका दे (pakā de) 'give cook' means to cook for someone. The second verb restricts the meaning of the main verb or adds a shade of meaning to it. Subsequently, the second verb was grammaticalised further into what is known as a light verb, mainly used to convey lexical aspect distinctions for the main verb.

The innovation is based on Sanskrit atmanepadi (fruit of the action accrues to the doer) and parasmaipadi verbs (fruit of the action accrues to some other than the doer). For example, पका दे (pakā de) 'give cook' has the result of the action (cooked food) going to someone else, and पका ले (pakā le) 'take cook' to the one who is doing the cooking.

== Attested languages ==
=== Pāli ===
Pali is the best attested of the Middle Indo-Aryan languages because of the extensive writings of early Buddhists. These include canonical texts, canonical developments such as Abhidhamma, and a thriving commentarial tradition associated with figures such as Buddhaghosa. Early Pāli texts, such as the Sutta Nipāta contain many "Magadhisms" (such as heke for eke; or masculine nominative singular in -e). Pāli continued to be a living second language until well into the second millennium. The Pali Text Society was founded in 1881 by Thomas William Rhys Davids to preserve, edit, and publish texts in Pāli, as well as English translations.

=== Ardhamāgadhī ===
Known from a few inscriptions, most importantly the pillars and edicts of Ashoka found in what is now Bihar.

=== Gāndhārī ===
Many texts in Kharoṣṭhi script have been discovered in the area centred on the Khyber Pass in what was known in ancient times as Gandhara and the language of the texts came to be called Gāndhārī. These are largely Buddhist texts which parallel the Pāli Canon, but include Mahāyāna texts as well. The language is distinct from other MIA dialects.

=== Elu ===
Elu (also Eḷa, Hela or Helu Prakrit) was a Sri Lankan Prakrit of the 3rd century BCE. It was ancestral to the Sinhalese and Dhivehi languages. One major source of sample is from Thonigala Rock Inscriptions, Anamaduwa.
