= Eastern Hindi languages =

Group of languages spoken in northern and central India

Eastern Hindi
- Geographic distribution: Awadh, Baghelkhand, Chhattisgarh
- Ethnicity: Awadhis, Baghelis, Chhattisgarhis, Halbis, Powaris
- Native speakers: approx. 65 million in India
- Linguistic classification: Indo-European: Indo-Iranian; Indo-Aryan; Central Indo-Aryan (Note: According to Katre, Nigam, Cardona, Turner, Kausen, and Kogan. However others also classify it within Eastern-Central, Western-Eastern, Intermediate or Eastern.); Eastern Hindi
- Early form: Ardhamagadhi Prakrit

Language codes
- Glottolog: east2726
- Geographical distribution of Eastern Hindi languages

The Eastern Hindi languages are a branch of the Indo-Aryan language family spoken primarily in Awadh region of Uttar Pradesh, Baghelkhand region of Madhya Pradesh, and Chhattisgarh, in Northern and Central India. Eastern Hindi languages evolved from Ardhamagadhi Prakrit, which is thought to be transitional between Sauraseni and Magadhi.

== Geographical extent ==
Eastern Hindi languages are primarily spoken in India and Nepal, but also have significant minorities in the Caribbean, Fiji, Mauritius, South Africa, Bangladesh, and Pakistan due to immigration. In India, they are mainly spoken in the Awadh region in eastern Uttar Pradesh, in the Baghelkhand region in northeastern Madhya Pradesh, and in Chhattisgarh.

== Languages and dialects ==
- Awadhi (3.85 m), spoken in north and north-central Uttar Pradesh as well as the Caribbean, Fiji, Mauritius, and South Africa
  - Caribbean Hindustani (300 k) (mostly based on Bhojpuri but has major Awadhi influence)
    - Sarnami Hindustani (150 k)
  - Fiji Hindi (460 k) (mostly based on Awadhi with major Bhojpuri influence)
  - Mauritian Bhojpuri (63 k) (mostly based on Bhojpuri but has major Awadhi influence)
- Bagheli (8 m), spoken in north-central Madhya Pradesh and south-eastern Uttar Pradesh.
- Chhattisgarhi (18 m), spoken in southeast Madhya Pradesh and northern and central Chhattisgarh.
  - Surgujia (1.7 m), spoken in Chhattisgarh

== See also ==
- Western Hindi languages
