= Anamaduwa =

Anamaduwa ආණමඩුව
- Town
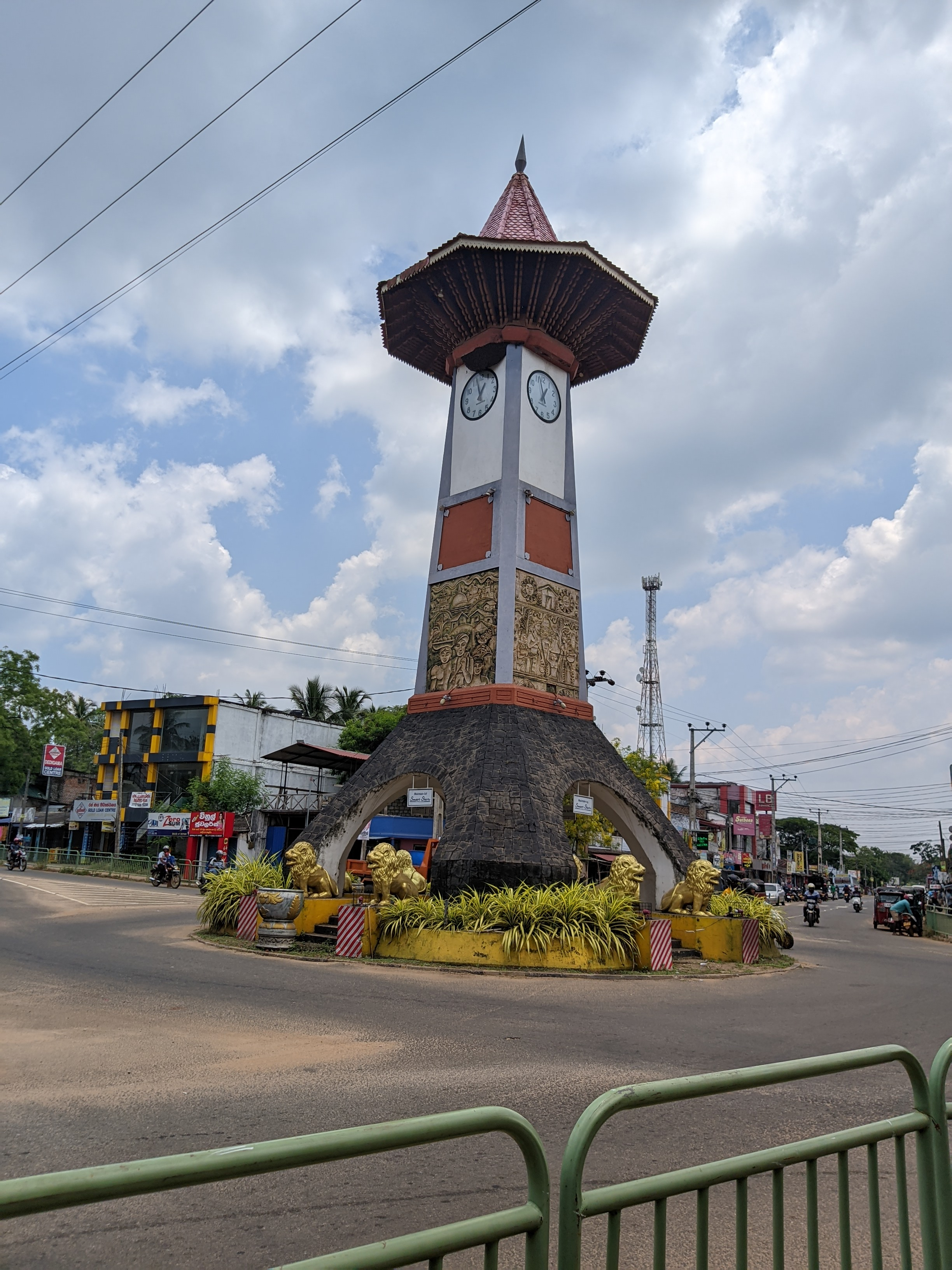
- Anamduwa Clock Tower

- Location within Sri Lanka
- Coordinates: 7°52′39″N 80°0′52″E
- Country: Sri Lanka
- District: Puttalam District

Population (2012)
  - Total: 38,286
- Time zone: UTC+5:30 (SLST)
- Postal code: 61500
- Area code: 032

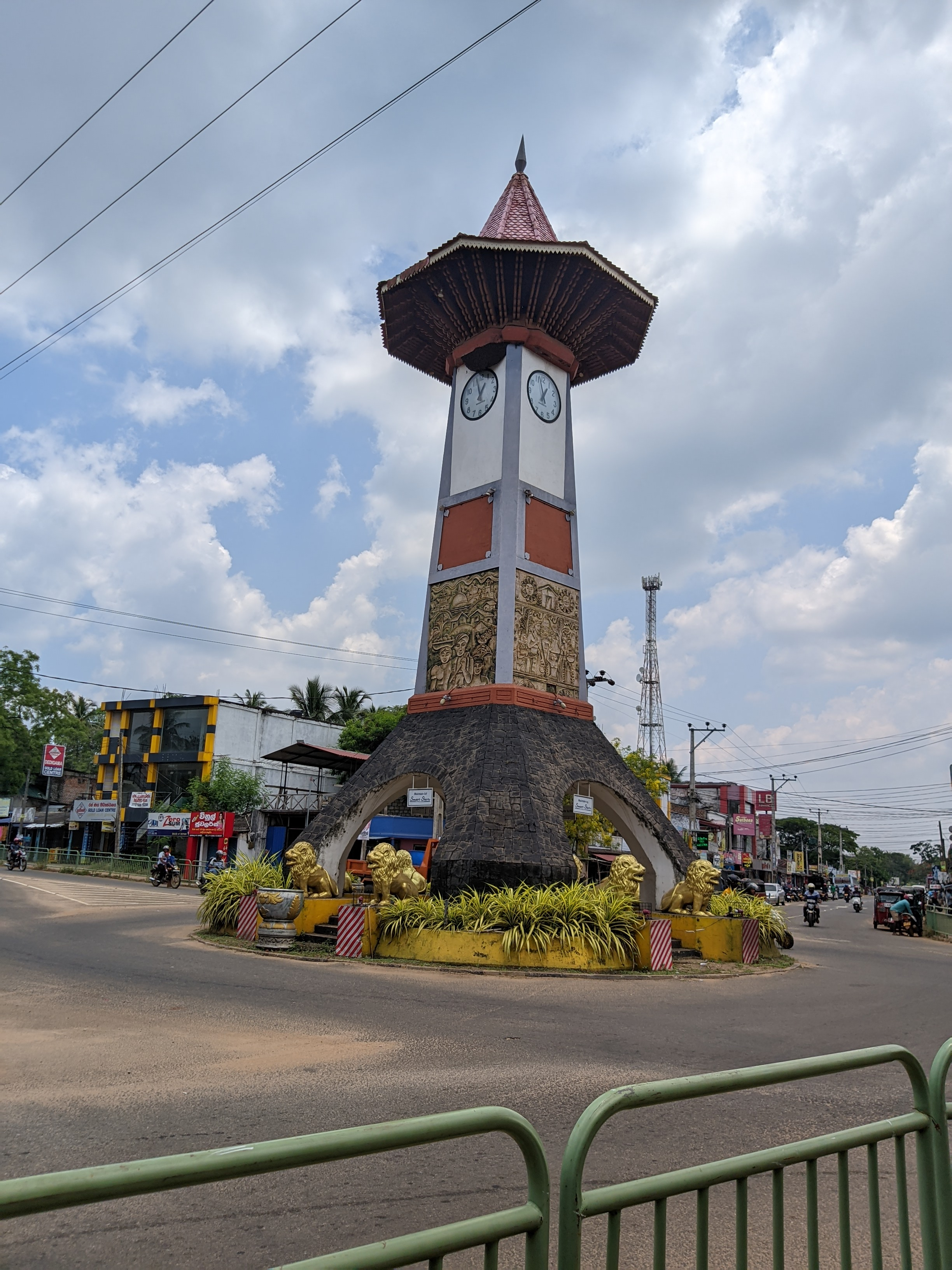

Anamaduwa (Sinhala: ආණමඩුව) is a town in Puttalam District, North Western Province, Sri Lanka. It is located about 28 km (17 mi) away from Puttalam.

== Etymology ==
According to one story, after uniting the country King Dutugemunu had given precious gifts to Nandimitra, one of the ten giant warriors belonged to the king. Nandimitra was given an area in the south-west region of Anuradhapura and he settled himself there with his battalion of elephants. It is believed the elephants were housed in a kraal (in Sinhalaː Ali Maduwa), where present-day Anamaduwa is situated. As time went by and the influence brought in by the Tamil language to the area, Ali Maduwa had become to Anei Madam and then evolved to current name of Anamaduwa.

== Tourist attractions ==
- Paramakanda Vihara, is an ancient Buddhist temple located on Paramakanda Rock in Anamaduwa. The vihara has been designated as one of archaeological protected places in Sri Lanka.
- Thonigala Rock Inscription, is a rock inscription found on a rock in anamaduwa. Presently, the inscription has been designated as an archaeological protected monument.

== See also ==
- Navagattegama
