= Paramakanda Raja Maha Vihara =

Ancient Buddhist temple in Puttalam District, Sri Lanka

- පරමාකන්ද රජ මහා විහාරය
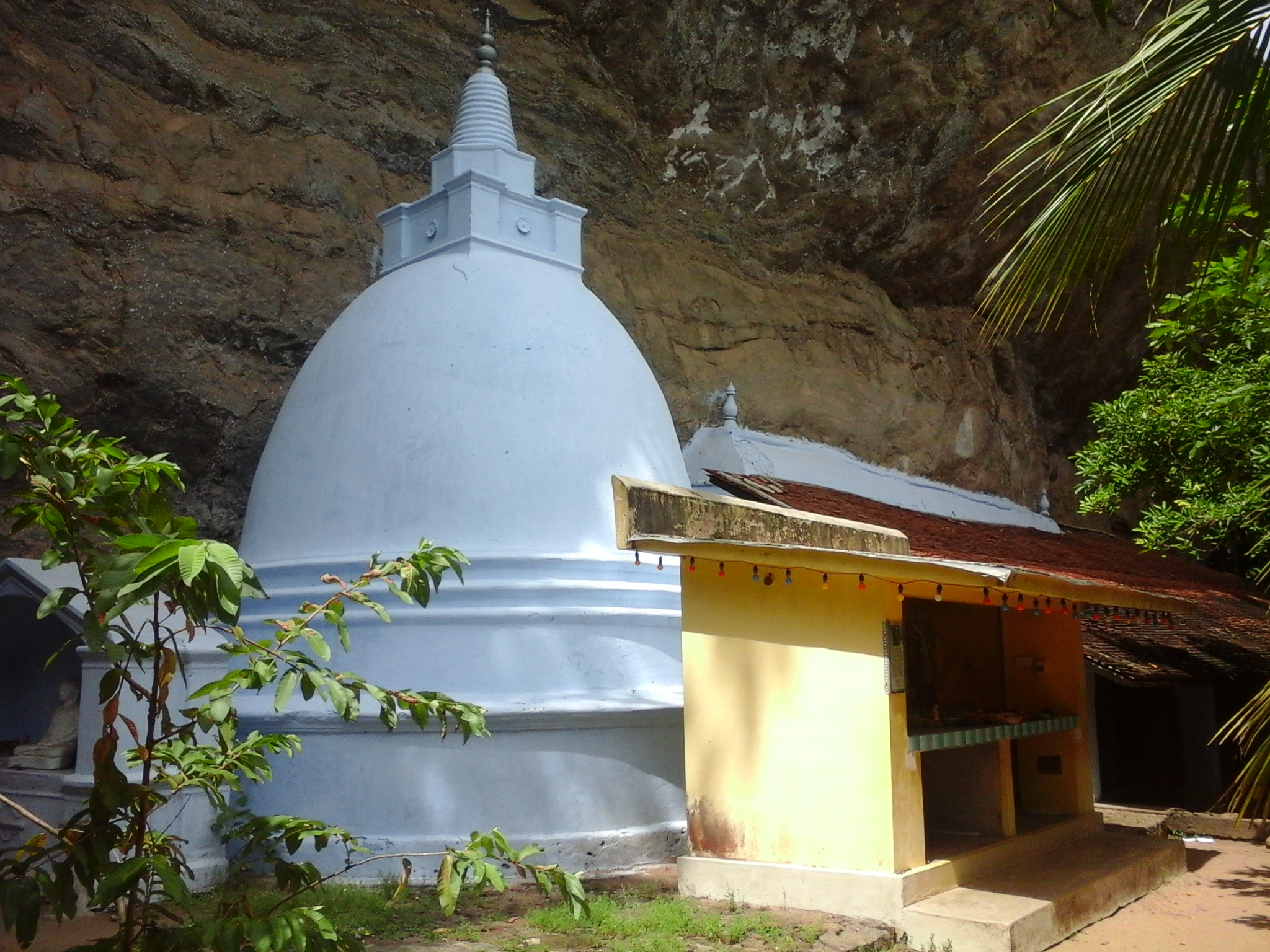

Religion
- Affiliation: Buddhism
- District: Puttalam
- Province: North Western Province

Location
- Location: Paramakanda, Anamaduwa, Sri Lanka
- Interactive map of Paramakanda Raja Maha Vihara
- Coordinates: 07°55′N 80°00′E

Architecture
- Type: Buddhist Temple
- Style: Cave temple
- Founder: King Walagamba

Paramakanda Raja Maha Vihara (Sinhala: පරමාකන්ද රජ මහා විහාරය) is an ancient Buddhist temple in Puttalam District, Sri Lanka. The temple is located in Paramakanda village approximately 4 km (2.5 mi) distance from the Anamaduwa town. The site has been formally recognised by the Government as an archaeological site in Sri Lanka. The designations were declared on 1 November 1996 and 6 June 2008 under the government Gazette numbers 948 and 1586.

== The temple ==
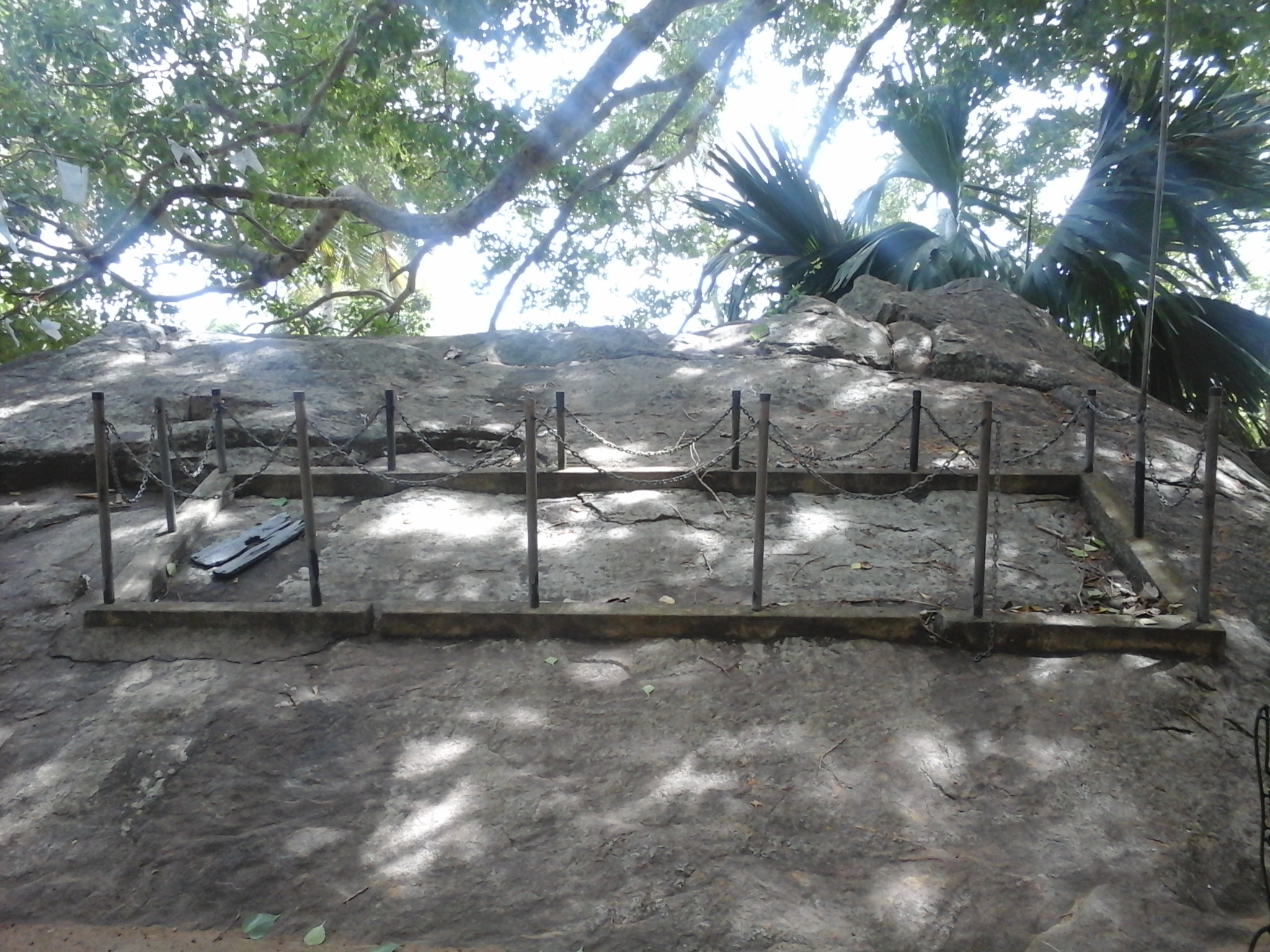
The inscription near the Bo tree

It is believed that the history of Paramakanda temple goes back to the reign of king Walagamba (103 BC and c. 89–77 BC).

The Vihara complex mainly consists of two terraces. The lower terrace includes the Stupa, Bodhi tree, dripledged rock caves, Bikkhu dwellings, the main image house and the bell tower. Another small image house, a Stupa and a rock carved foot print of Buddha are found in the upper temple premises. The main image house of the lower terrace is adorned with paintings and sculptures belonging to the Kandyan tradition as well as the new art style.

== Inscriptions ==
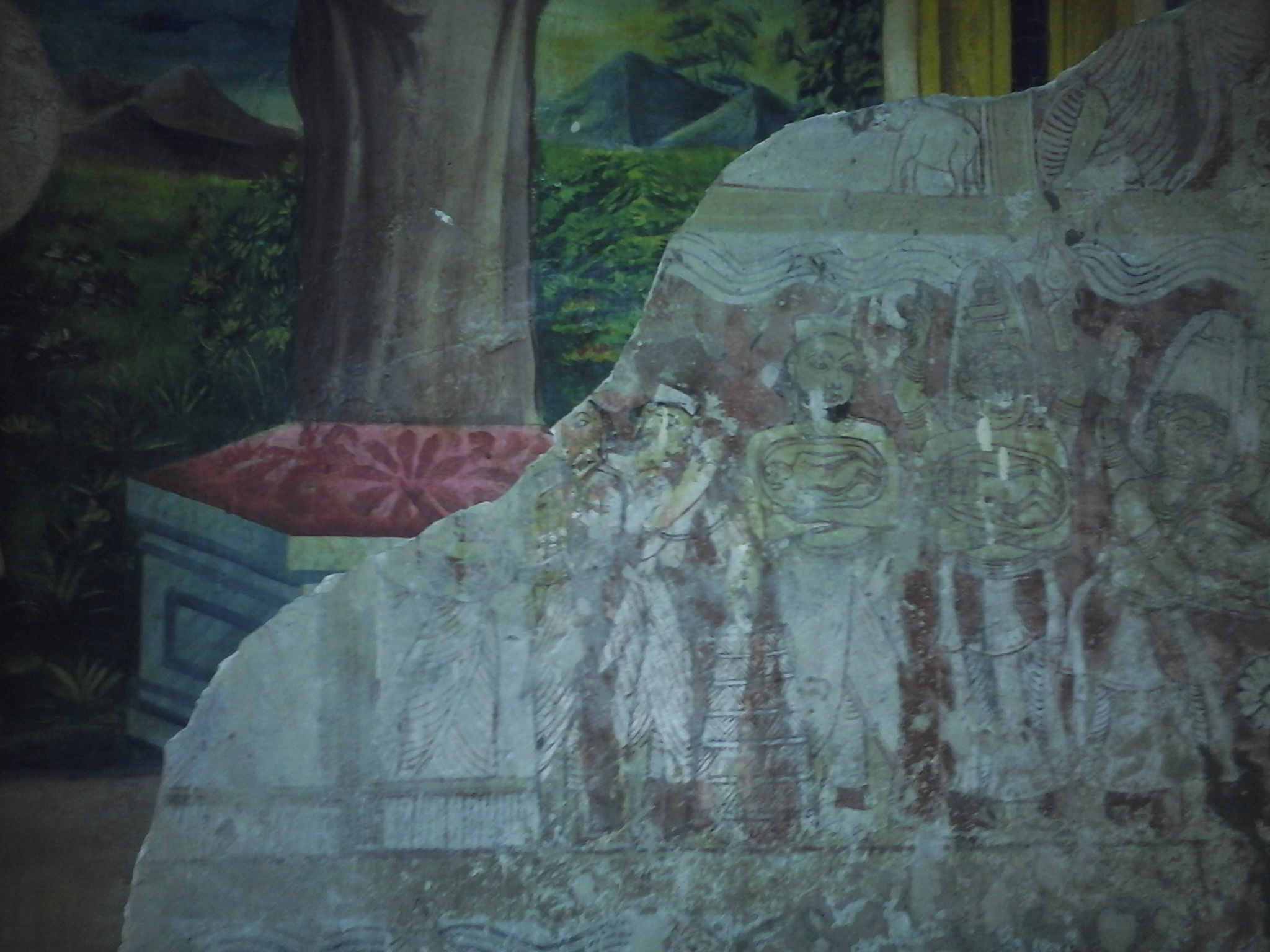
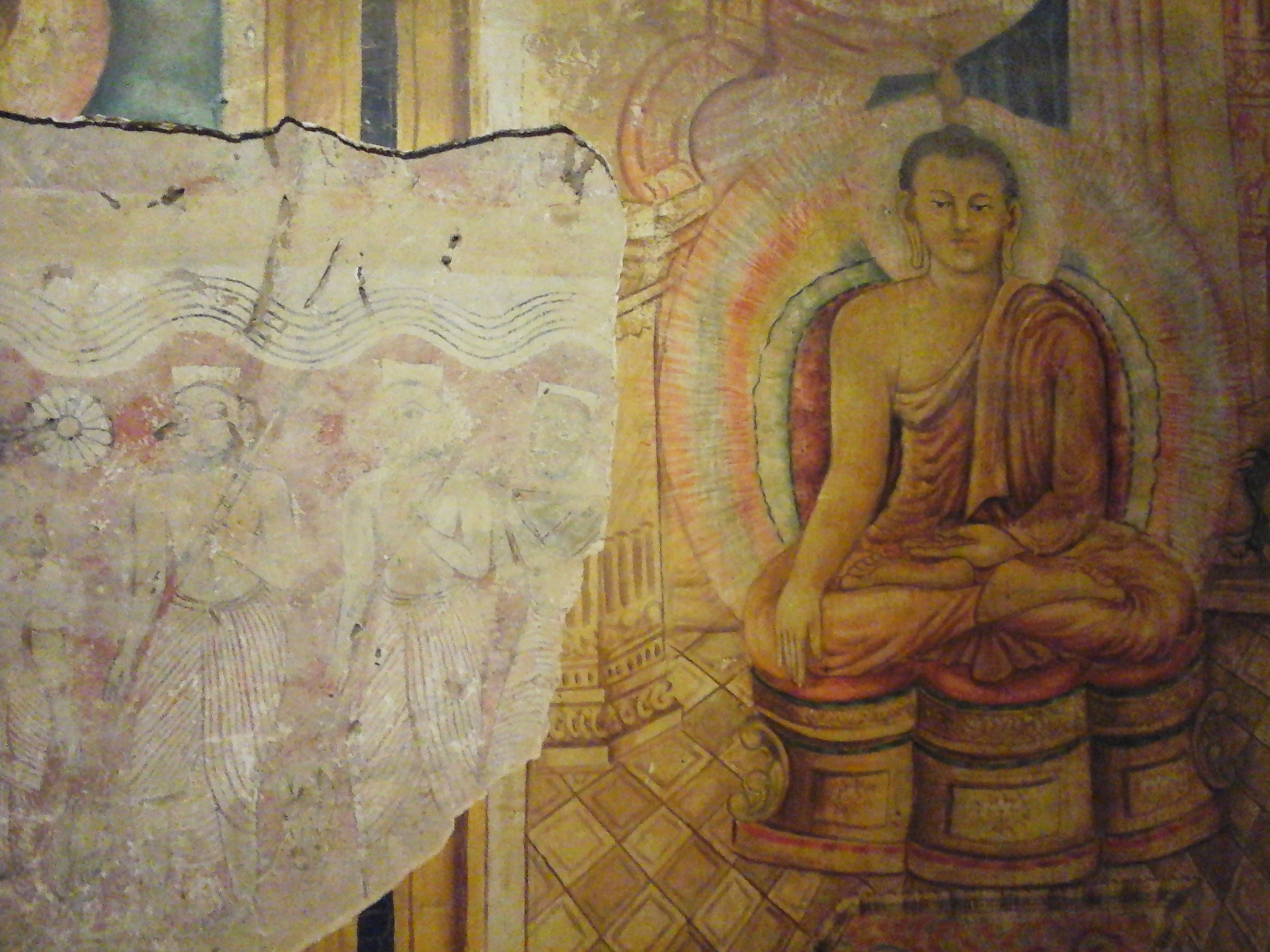
Old paintings have been emerged as crumble of newly painted layer

Few rock inscriptions have been discovered in the temple premises. One inscription has been incised on the vertical face of a rock at one side of a small pool of water. Another inscription is found on a rock near Bo tree and belongs to the 7th century A.D.

=== The inscription near the pool ===
Period: 1st century AD, Script: Early Brahmi, Language: Old Sinhalese
Content: "The inscription mentions about the cistern of the chief daring mariner Tissa, the son of the chief Abhaya"

== See also ==
- Thonigala Rock Inscription, Anamaduwa
