= Elu =

3rd century BCE Sri Lankan language; ancestor of Sinhalese and Dhivehi

Eḷu
- Helu
- Region: Sri Lanka
- Era: 3rd century BCE; Evolved into Sinhalese and Dhivehi
- Language family: Indo-European: Indo-Iranian; Indo-Aryan; Eḷu
- Writing system: Ashokan Brahmi (Dhammalipi)

Language codes
- ISO 639-3: –
- Glottolog: None

Eḷa, also Elu, Hela or Helu Prakrit, was a Middle Indo-Aryan language or Prakrit of the 3rd century BCE, that was used in Sri Lanka. It was ancestral to the Sinhalese language and Maldivian language.

Robert Caesar Childers, in the Journal of the Royal Asiatic Society, states:

[Elu] is the name by which is known an ancient form of the Sinhala language from which the modern vernacular of Ceylon is immediately received, and to which the latter bears is of the same relation that the English of today bears to Anglo-Saxon... The name Elu is no other than Sinhala much succeeded, standing for an older form, Hĕla or Hĕlu, which occurs in some ancient works, and this again for a still older, Sĕla, which brings us back to the Pali Sîhala.

The Pali scholar Thomas William Rhys Davids refers to Eḷu as "the Prakrit of Ceylon".

The Hela Havula are a modern Sri Lankan literary organisation that advocate the use of Eḷu terms over Sanskritisms. Eḷu is often referred to by modern Sinhalese as amisra, Sanskrit and Sinhalese term for "unmixed".

A feature of Eḷu is its preference for short vowels, loss of aspiration and the reduction of compound consonants found frequently in other Prakrits such as Pali.

== Eḷu in comparison with Pali and Sanskrit ==
Being a Prakrit, Eḷu is closely related to other Prakrit such as Pali. Indeed, a very large proportion of Eḷu word-stems are identical in form to Pali. The connections were sufficiently well known that technical terms from Pali and Sanskrit were easily converted into Eḷu by a set of conventional phonological transformations. Because of the prevalence of these transformations, it is not always possible to tell whether a given Eḷu word is a part of the old Prakrit lexicon, or a transformed borrowing from Sanskrit.

=== Vowels and diphthongs ===
- Sanskrit ai and au always monophthongise to Eḷu e and o, respectively

Examples: maitrī → met, auṣadha → osada

- Sanskrit avi becomes Eḷu e (i.e. avi → ai → e)

Example: sthavira → thera

=== Sound changes ===
- Initial c in Sanskrit and Pali becomes s or h

Examples: canda → sa^{n}da, ha^{n}da

- P if not omitted becomes v

Examples: rūpa → ruva, dīpa → diva

- The Sanskrit sibilants ś, ṣ, and s merge as Eḷu s

Examples: śaraṇa → saraṇa, doṣa → dosa

- The Sanskrit kti becomes ti or vi

Examples: bhakti → bätiya, shakti → saviya

=== Compound consonants ===
At the beginning of a word only a single consonant can remain

Examples: dharma → dahama
Examples: prāna → pana

In the middle of a word no group may exceed one consonant

Examples: artha → aruta
Examples: danta → data

== Samples ==
=== Tōṇigala Rock Inscription of Śrīmeghavarṇṇa (4th century A.D) ===
Si! Puviya Mahasena-maharajaha puta Sarimekavaṇa-Aba-maha-rajaha cata legi-taka tiṇavanaka-vasahi.

[Lines 1–2] Hail! In the time of the third year after the raising of the umbrella by the great king Sirimekavaṇa Aba son of the great king Mahasena.

Nakarahi utarapasahi Kaḷahumanaka-niya-matanahi siya aviya⸗kiṇiyeni nikata Kaḍubalagamakehi vasanaka - Ameti-paheja-Sivaya-ha puta-Devayaha Yahisapavaya-nava-vaherakehi dina ariyavasa vaṭavi de hakaḍa dasa amaṇaka vi ica sa amaṇaka udi ica bayali dasa amaṇa ica.

[Lines 2–6] Two hakaḍas (cartloads) and ten amaṇas of paddy, six amaṇas of udi and ten amaṇas of beans were deposited [with the stipulation that the capital should] neither be spent nor decreased, by Devaya the son of Sivaya, a member of the Council of Ministers, residing at the village of Kaḍubala, with the assembly of the merchants’ guild at Kaḷahumana [situated] in the northern quarter of the city; and were granted for the purpose of conducting the holy vassa in the new monastery of Yahisapavaya.

Me de hakaḍa dasa a-maṇaka vi piṭadaḍa-hasahi veḍa akala-hasahi veḍha ma-de-hasahi veḍha pacavisiya amaṇaka vi ica me sa amaṇaka udihi veḍha eka amaṇa de pekaḍaka udi ica dasa amaṇaka bayalihi veḍha de a-maṇa de pekaḍaka bayali ica.

[Lines 6–10] Of the aforesaid two hakaḍas and ten amaṇas of paddy, the interest at the principal harvest (piṭadaḍa hasa), the interest at the secondary harvest and the interest at the intermediate harvest [amount to] twenty-five amaṇas of paddy. Of the aforesaid six amaṇas of udi, the interest is one amaṇas and two pekaḍas of udi. Of the aforesaid ten amaṇas of beans, the interest is two amaṇas and two pekaḍas of beans.

Me vataka-vaṇahi gahe kiṇiya ciṭa-vaya veḍha geṇa tiṇaḍa hakaṭa dana-vaṭa ica atarakajaka-vaṭa ica atarakaja-(pari)kara-yapeni ica di miya-vaṭa peṇi tila ica bunatela ica loṇa ica palaha-vaṭa ica veṭayala ica vahera . . ga sara pa . . pacanahi miliya padiya ica

[Lines 10–14] Of the above-mentioned deposit, the capital should be left unspent and from the interest received, the expenses for two and a half hakaḍas of boiled rice, atarakaja, dishes taken with atarakaja, curd, honey, sweets, sesame, butter (?), salt, green herbs, and turmeric should be given at the refectory of the monastery, . . .

Meva [taka] veḍhavataka geṇa vanaya va[na]ya atovasahi Nikamaniya-cada puṇamasa doḷasa-paka-divasa [a]riyavasa karana maha-bikusagah⸗aṭa niyata koṭu Yahisapava[ta-na]-va-vaherakahi dini.

[Lines 14–17] [The above] were granted to the new monastery at Yahisapavata so that the interest may be taken and appropriated for the use of the great community of monks who perform the holy vassa on the twelfth day of the bright half of the month of Nikamaniya in every succeeding rainy season.

Thonigala Rock Inscriptions, Anamaduwa under reign of Gamani Abhaya (1st century A.D)

== List of Elu words with their Sanskrit and Pali equivalents ==
Elu	Sanskrit	Pali	English
äsa	akṣi	akkhi	eye
adara	ādara	ādara	respect
aga	agra	agga	end, chief, principal
ahasa	ākāśa	ākāsa	sky
akosa	ākrōśa	akkosa	insult, abuse
akmana	ākramana	akkamana	attack
aksuma	akṣama	akkhama	intolerance, impatience
akura	akṣara	akkhara	letter of the alphabet
anada	ānanda	ānanda	bliss
aruta	artha	attha	meaning
asuna	āsana	āsana	seat
ata	hasta	hattha	hand
atuna	antra	anta	intestine
bambu	brahma	brahma	Brahma
bamburā	barbara	babbhara	barbarian
bamunā	brāhmaṇa	brāhmaṇa	Brahman
basa	bhāṣā	bhāsā	language
bima	bhūmi	bhūmi	land
bubula	budbuda	bubbula	bubble
boduna	bhōjana	bhojana	food
bodu	bauddha	bodha	Buddhist
bōsat	bōdhisattva	bodhisatta	Bodhisattva
dahama, dam	dharma	dhamma	Dharma
data	danta	danta	tooth
däla	jāla	jāla	Net (device)
devola	devālaya	devālaya	temple
diga, digu	dīrgha	dīgha	long
diva	jihvā	jivhā	tongue
diviya	jīvita	jīvita	life
dudana, dujana	durjana	dujjana	wicked, malicious
dujanā	durjanayā		wicked person
dukata	duṣkṛta	dukkaṭa	wicked deed
dulaba	durlabha	dullabha	rare
duma	dhūma	dhūma	smoke
dupa	dhūpa	dhūpa	incense
gama	grāma	gāma	village
gata	gātra	gatta	body
gatakura	gātrākṣara		consonant
kana	karṇa	kanna	ear
karuvā	kāra		person
keta	kṣetra	khetta	field
kiḍa	krīḍā		sport
kila	kīlā	kīlā	sport
kinu	kṛṣṇa	kanha	dark
kilu	kliṣṭa	kiliṭṭha	dirty
kiluṭu	kliṣṭa	kiliṭṭha	dirty
kiri	kṣīra	khīra	milk
kumarā	kumāraka	kumāra	son, prince
kumari	kumāri	kumāri	girl, princess
kuriru	krūra	kurūra	cruel
laka	laṅkā	laṅkā	Sri Lanka
lassana	lakṣaṇa	lakkhana	beautiful
lova	loka	loka	world
maga	mārga	magga	way
magula	maṅgala	maṅgala	marriage
matura	mantra	manta	incantation
mäda	madhyama, madhya	majjha	middle
miturā	mitra	mitta	friend
mugalan	maudgalyāyana	moggallana	mogallana
mudu	mṛdu	mudu	soft
muwa	mukha	mukha	mouth
mädura	mandira	mandira	palace
mula	mūla	mūla	origin
näba	nābhi	nābhi	navel
näva	naukā	nāvā	ship
	nētra	netta	eye
nidana	nidhāna	nidhāna	treasure
nimala	nirmala	nimmala	pure
nipana	niṣpanna		production
nivana	nirvāṇa	nibbāna	Nirvana
nuvara	nagara	nagara	city
pabala	prabala	pabala	mighty
pamana	pramāna	pamāna	amount
parapura	paramparā		generation
pänaya	praśna	pañha	problem, question
pava	pāpa	pāpa	sin
pavasa	pipāsa	pipāsam	thirst
parana	purāṇa	purāṇa	old
parusa	paruṣa	pharusa	harsh
pasana	prasanna	pasanna	pleasant
pāsala	pāṭhaśālā	pāṭasālā	school
pavaruna	prakaraṇa	pakaraṇa	treatise
pätuma	prārthanā	patthanā	wish, hope
pedesa	pradeśa	padesa	country
pema	prēma	pema	love
piduma	pūjā	pūjā	offering
pina	punya	punya	merit
pokuna	puṣkariṇī	pokkhariṇī	pond
poson	pūrva-śravaṇa	pubba-savana	(name of a month)
pota	pustaka	pottaka	book
pun	pūra, pūrṇa	punna	full
pupa	puṣpa	puppha	flower
putā	putra	putta	son
puva	pūrva	pubba	former, prior
puvata	pravṛtti	pavatti	news
rada	rājan	rājā	king
rakusā	rākṣasa	rakkhasa	demon
ratu, rat	raktaka	ratta	red
räsa	raśmi	rasmi	ray
räya	rātri	ratti	night
ruka	vṛkṣa	rukkha	tree
ruva	rūpa	rūpa	shape, form
sa^{n}gamit	sanghamitra	sangamitta	
sa^{n}da	candra	canda	moon
sämuni	śākyamuni		sakyamuni
sena	sena		army
sidura	chidr	chidda	hole, gap, space
sirura	śarīra	sarīra	body
soyurā, sohowurā	sahōdara	sodariya	brother
so^{n}duru	sundara	sundara	beautiful
supina	svapna	supina	dream
supun	sampūrṇa	sampunna	complete
teda	teja		magnificence
tavasā	tāpasa		hermit
tisula	triśūla		Trishula (trident)
utura	uttara	uttarā	north
väkiya	vākya		Sentence
vesak	vaiṣākha	Visakha	Vesak
veses	viśeṣa	visesa	special
viyarana	vyākarana	vyākaraṇa	grammar
yakā	yakṣa	yakkha	yaksha
yatura	yantra	yanta	machine
yiva	jīva	jīva	life

== See also ==
- Linguistic history of the Indian subcontinent
