= Richard Pischel =

German Indologist

- Born: Richard Pischel; 18 January 1849; Breslau, Prussia
- Died: 26 December 1908 (aged 59); Madras, British India
- Occupation: Indologist

Richard Pischel (18 January 1849 – 26 December 1908) was a German Indologist born in Breslau. He wrote a textbook on Prakrit grammar in 1900 and became a professor of comparative linguistics and Indology at Halle (1885-1902) and then at Berlin.

== Life and work ==
Pischel was born in Breslau to surgical instrument manufacturer Ernst Gottfried and Emilie Haertel (d. 1857). He went to the local gymnasium until 1867. In 1870 he received his doctorate from the University of Breslau under the guidance of Adolf Friedrich Stenzler (1807-1887). His graduate thesis was De Kalidasae Cakuntali recensionibus ("On the Recensions of Kālidāsa's Shakuntala"). He was conscripted into the Franco-German war 1870-71 after which he became a Bopp scholar and went to London and Oxford. In 1875, he received an appointment to the University of Kiel, where he was a professor of Sanskrit and comparative linguistics.

From 1885 to 1902, he was a professor of Indology and comparative linguistics at the University of Halle. At Halle, he collaborated with Karl Friedrich Geldner (1852-1929) on important Vedic studies (Vedische Studien; three volumes). In 1900 he was appointed rector of the University, and from 1886 to 1902, served as director and librarian of the Deutschen Morgenländischen Gesellschaft (German Oriental Society).

In 1902 he was appointed professor of Indology, succeeding Albrecht Weber, at the University of Berlin. He fell sick on a ship journey to India and died on 26 December 1908 in Madras shortly after setting foot in India, where he was scheduled to give a series of lectures. One of Pischel's better written efforts was the masterful Grammatik der Prakrit-Sprachen (Grammar of the Prakrit languages, 1900). Two years prior to his death, he published a book on the life and teachings of Buddha, titled Leben und Lehre des Buddha. The University of Calcutta acquired some of his books and named a Pischel Hall after him.

Well-known students of Pischel were Friedrich Schrader (not to be mixed up with Friedrich Otto Schrader (1876-1961)), who became known as a writer, newspaper editor and art historian in Constantinople, Baron Alexander von Staël-Holstein, who became a famous scholar of Central Asian languages and Sinology, and Karl Eugen Neumann, himself a Buddhist since the 1880s, and with his translations of texts by Buddha one of the founders of occidental "Neo-Buddhism", with a huge impact on contemporary writers and intellectuals such as Hermann Hesse and Thomas Mann.
