= Shauraseni Prakrit =

Ancient Middle Indo-Aryan language

- Śaurasenī Prākṛta
- 𑀰𑁅𑀭𑀲𑁂𑀦𑀻 (Brahmi)
- Region: northern Indian subcontinent, particularly Surasena
- Era: c. 3rd to 10th centuries AD
- Language family: Indo-European: Indo-Iranian; Indo-Aryan; Shauraseni Prakrit

Language codes
- ISO 639-3: psu
- Glottolog: saur1252

Shauraseni Prakrit (Sanskrit: शौरसेनी प्राकृत, IAST: Śaurasenī Prākṛta, Sanskrit pronunciation: [ɕɐurɐseːniː praːkr̩t̪ɐ]) was a Middle Indo-Aryan language and a Dramatic Prakrit. Shauraseni was the vernacular of the Surasena region and the chief language used in drama in medieval northern India such as those written in Jain Shauraseni. Most of the material in this language originates from the 3rd to 10th-centuries, and represented a regional language variety with minor modifications to the same linguistic substratum as other Dramatic Prakrit varieties.

Among the Prakrits, Shauraseni is said to be the one most closely related to Classical Sanskrit in that it "is derived from the Old Indian Indo-Aryan dialect of the Madhyadeśa on which Classical Sanskrit was mainly based."

== Relationship to later languages ==
It gave rise to Apabhramsa languages such as Shauraseni Apabhramsa (Śaurasenī Apabhraṁśa; from which descended Old Hindi, ancestral to modern Hindi-Urdu); Gurjara Apabhramsa (from which descended Old Gujarati, ancestral to modern Gujarati, Rajasthani); Takka Apabhramsa (ancestral to modern Punjabi, Saraiki, Pahari-Pothwari, Hindko) and Vracada Apabhramsa (ancestral to modern Sindhi).

According to Mangat Bhardwaj, it is possible that the Western and Eastern Punjabi zones may have originally spoken different Apabhraṁśas, with the Lahnda zone being primarily Paiśāchī Apabhraṁśa while the Eastern Punjabi area consisted of a transitional zone of Śaurasenī merging into Paiśāchī, with Śaurasenī being spoken in the neighbouring Western Hindi zone. As per Suniti Kumar Chatterji (1926), the protoform of Sindhi, Lahndi, and Punjabi was Udicya (north-western dialects) while Punjabi also bore influence from Sourseni. According to Prabodh Pandit, the Indo-Aryan languages was initially split into three groups, with Punjabi, Lahndi, Sindhi, Kachchi, Kashmiri, and Pahari forming out of the north (north-western) group. As per this formulization, eastern Punjabi (originally very similar to Lahndi) was later influenced by the central zone, first by Śaurasenī and later by Braj, leading it to deviate from Lahndi.

== See also ==
- Central Indo-Aryan languages
- Western Indo-Aryan languages
- Western Hindi languages
- Eastern Hindi languages
