= Ardhamagadhi Prakrit =

Middle Indo-Aryan language of India

- Ardhamāgadhī
- Brahmi: 𑀅𑀭𑁆𑀥𑀫𑀸𑀕𑀥𑀻
- Region: India
- Extinct: Developed into Eastern Hindi languages
- Language family: Indo-European: Indo-Iranian; Indo-Aryan; Ardhamagadhi Prakrit

Language codes
- ISO 639-3: pka
- Glottolog: None

Ardhamagadhi Prakrit was a Middle Indo-Aryan language and a Dramatic Prakrit thought to have been spoken in modern-day Bihar and Uttar Pradesh and used in some early Buddhist and Jain dramas. It was likely a Central Indo-Aryan language, related to Pali and the later Shauraseni Prakrit. The Eastern Hindi languages evolved from Ardhamagadhi Prakrit.

== Relationship with Pali ==
Theravada Buddhist tradition has long held that Pali was synonymous with Magadhi and there are many analogies between it and Ardhamāgadhī, literally 'half-Magadhi'. Ardhamāgadhī was prominently used by Jain scholars and is preserved in the Jain Agamas. Both Gautama Buddha and the Tirthankara Mahavira preached in the region of Magadha.

Ardhamāgadhī differs from later Magadhi Prakrit on similar points as Pāli. For example, Ardhamāgadhī preserves historical [l], unlike later Magadhi, where [l] changed into [r]. Additionally, in the noun inflection, Ardhamagadhi shows the ending [-o] instead of Magadhi Prakrit [-e] in many metrical places.

Pali: Dhammapada 103:

Yo sahassaṃ sahassena, saṅgāme mānuse jine;

Ekañca jeyyamattānaṃ, sa ve saṅgāmajuttamo.

Greater in battle than the man who would conquer a thousand-thousand men,

is he who would conquer just one — himself.

Ardhamagadhi: Saman Suttam 125:

Jo sahassam sahassanam, samgame dujjae jine.

Egam jinejja appanam, esa se paramo jao.

One may conquer thousands and thousands of enemies in an invincible battle;

but the supreme victory consists in conquest over one's self.
