= Dramatic Prakrit =

Middle Indo-Aryan language registers

Dramatic Prakrits were those standard forms of Prakrit dialects that were used in dramas and other literature in medieval India. They may have once been spoken languages or were based on spoken languages, but continued to be used as literary languages long after they ceased to be spoken. Dramatic Prakrits are important for the study of the development of Indo-Aryan languages, because their usage in plays and literature is always accompanied by a translation in Sanskrit.

== Dialects ==
The phrase "Dramatic Prakrits" often refers to the three most prominent of them, Shauraseni, Magadhi and Maharashtri Prakrit. However, there were a slew of other less commonly used Prakrits that also fall into this category. These include Prācya, Bahliki, Dakshinatya (spoken in modern-day states of Karnataka, Andhra Pradesh, Telangana and Maharashtra), Sakari, Candali, Sabari, Abhiri, Dramili, and Odri. There was an astoundingly strict structure to the use of these different Prakrits in dramas. Characters each spoke a different Prakrit based on their role and background; for example, Dramili was the language of "forest-dwellers", Shauraseni was spoken by "the heroine and her female friends", and Avanti was spoken by "cheats and rogues". The Prakrits varied in intelligibility with Shauraseni being most similar to classical Sanskrit while Magadhi Prakrit being most similar to classical Pali.

Maharashtri is a particularly interesting case. Maharashtri was often used for poetry and as such, diverged from proper Sanskrit grammar mainly to fit the language to the meter of different styles of poetry. The new grammar stuck, which leads to the unique flexibility of vowels lengths, amongst other anomalies, in Marathi.

The three principal Dramatic Prakrits and some of their descendant languages:

Shauraseni Prakrit
Shauraseni was used in north-central India, later evolving into the Hindi languages, viz. the varieties of Hindi, the Central Zone of modern Indic, including Hindustani and Punjabi.

Magadhi Prakrit
Magadhi was used in eastern India, later evolving into the Eastern Indo-Aryan languages, including Bengali, Assamese, Odia, and the Bihari languages (Bhojpuri, Magahi, Maithili), among others.

Ardhamāgadhī Prākrit
Ardhamagadhi Prakrit was a Middle Indo-Aryan language and a Dramatic Prakrit thought to have been spoken in modern-day Bihar and Uttar Pradesh and used in some early Buddhist and Jain dramas. It was likely a Central Indo-Aryan language, related to Pali and the later Shauraseni Prakrit.

Āvantī, Prācyā, Bāhlīkā, Dākṣiṇātyā are other dialects not known to us today.

== See also ==
- Apabhraṃśa
- Pali
