= Addahamāṇa =

Prakrit writer from Multan

Addahamāṇa (the Apabhraṃśa form of the name ʿAbd ur-Raḥmān or Abdul Rahman), also spelt as Addahmāṇ, was the last major Apabhraṃśa poet or first major Punjabi writer based out of Multan (known as Mulasthana). (Note: It is difficult to dilineate a boundary between late Middle Indic and early Modern Indic stages.) He was a Muslim. He authored the Sandeśarāsaka epic poem. (Note: His work is also known as 'Sannehaya Rāsaya'.) According to Bhardwaj (2016), he flourished in the 11th century, Roberts (1999) dates him to the 12th century, while as per Ollet (2017), he flourished in the 13th century. Asif (2016) claims his Sandeśarāsaka was written in the late 12th century, being compiled near Jaisalmer and based upon Kalidasa's Meghasandesa. According to Flood (2022), he wrote his romance poem in the early 13th century. Addahamāṇa stated that his family originated from "the land of Muslims" (the western lands inhabited by mlecchas) and that he was "the lotus of his family in Prakrit poetry". He began his poem with a Quranic invocation (hamd) and his work contains geographical information about the surrounding environs of a route from Multan to Cambay.
