= Thonigala Rock Inscriptions, Anamaduwa =

Prehistoric inscriptions in Sri Lanka

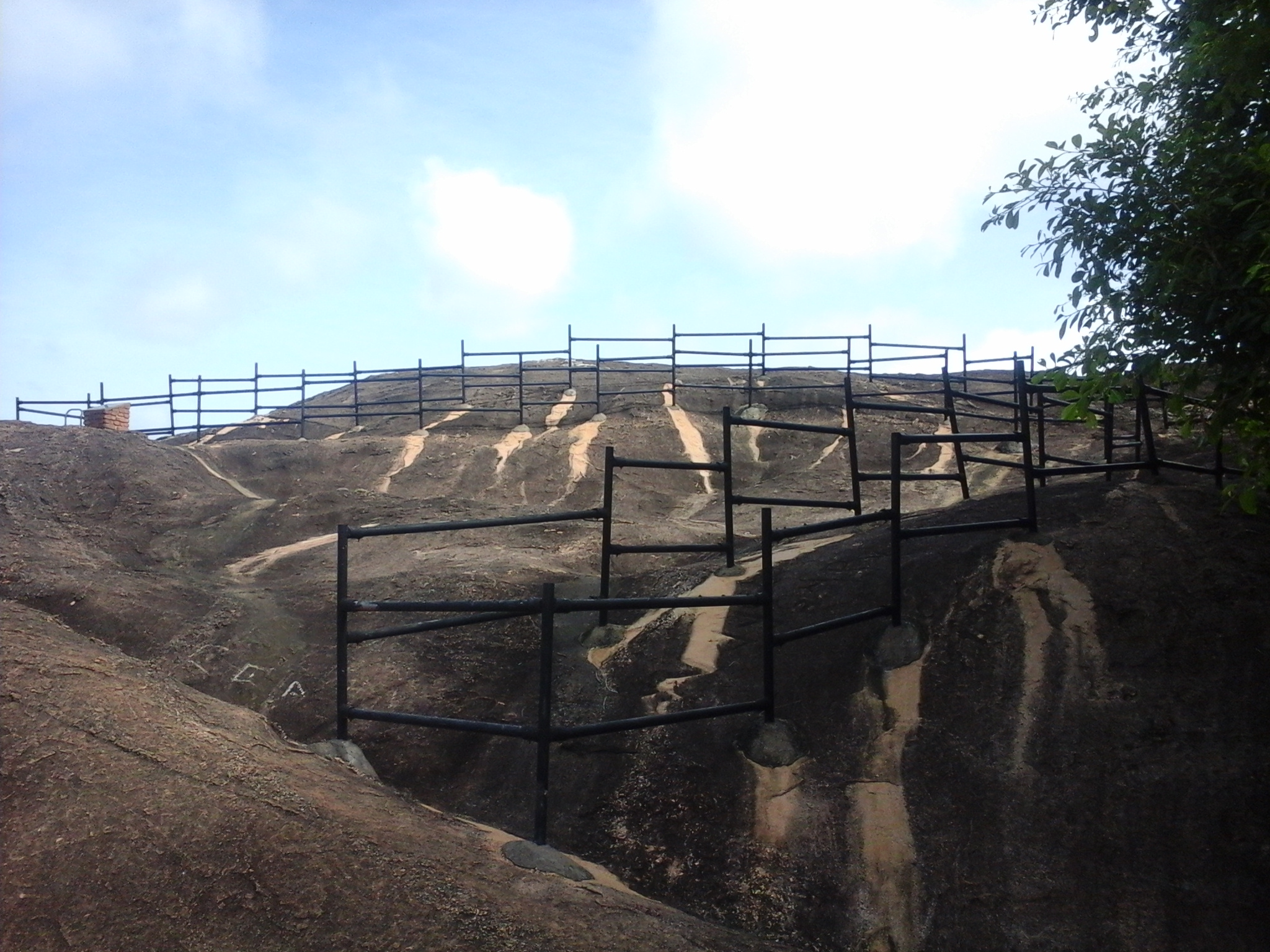
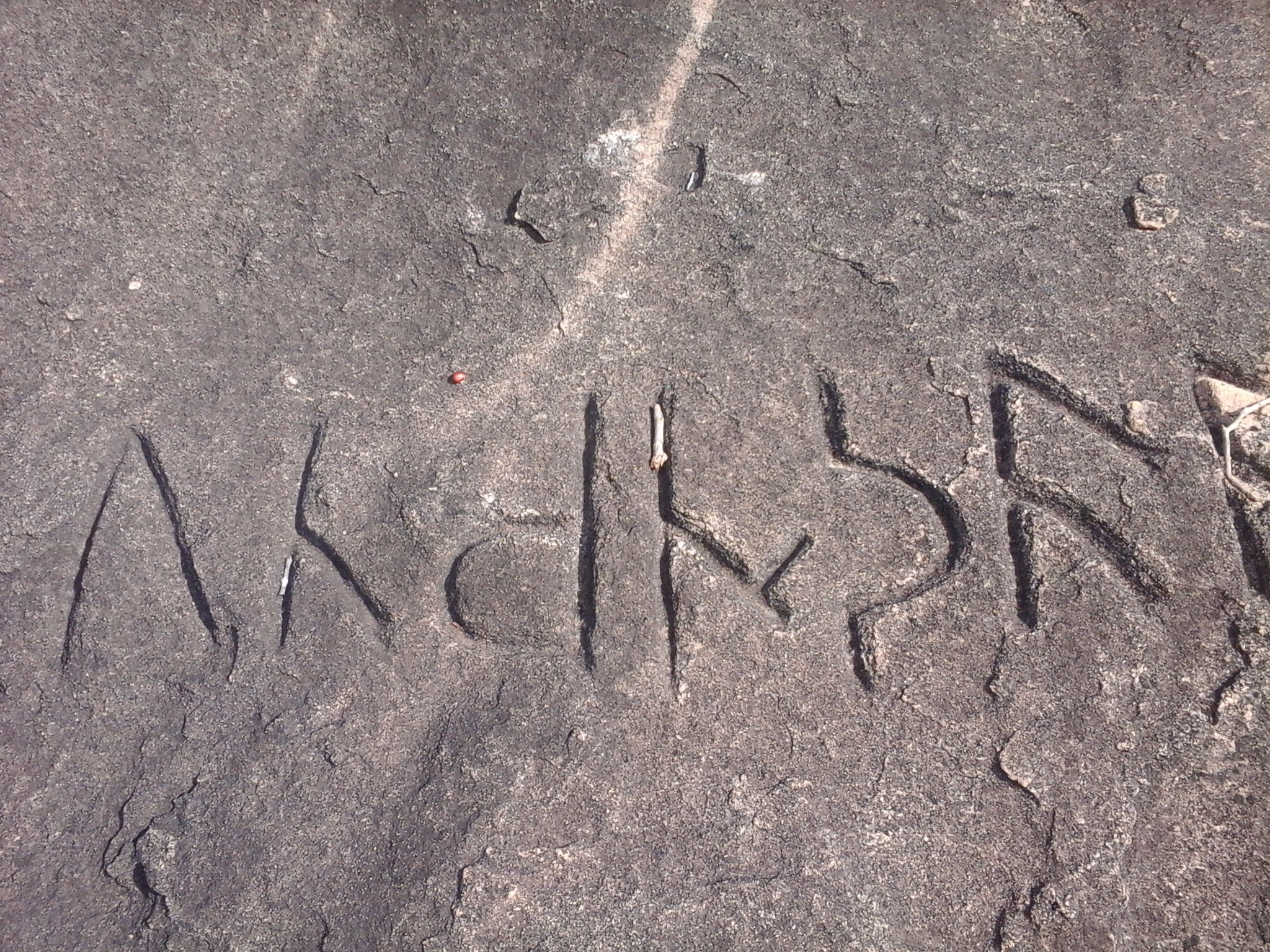
Rock Inscription number 1

Thonigala Rock Inscriptions (Sinhala: තෝනිගල සෙල් ලිපිය) are two Elu-language inscriptions engraved on a rock situated in Anamaduwa of Sri Lanka, written in Brahmi alphabet. Each inscription is about 100 feet long and each letter is about one feet in height and engraved about one inch deep in to the rock. Also it is said to be the largest rock inscription found in Sri Lanka.

== History ==
Thonigala rock inscriptions are dated back to the first century BC to the period of King Mahaculi Mahathissa (76-62 BC), who was a son of King Walagamba. The inscriptions reveal details about a grant of a lake and village to a Buddhist Monastery named Achagirika Tissa Pabbata. Today this Monastery is believed to be the Paramakanda Raja Maha Vihara, which is located about 5 kilometres (3 miles) from Thonigala.

== Contents ==
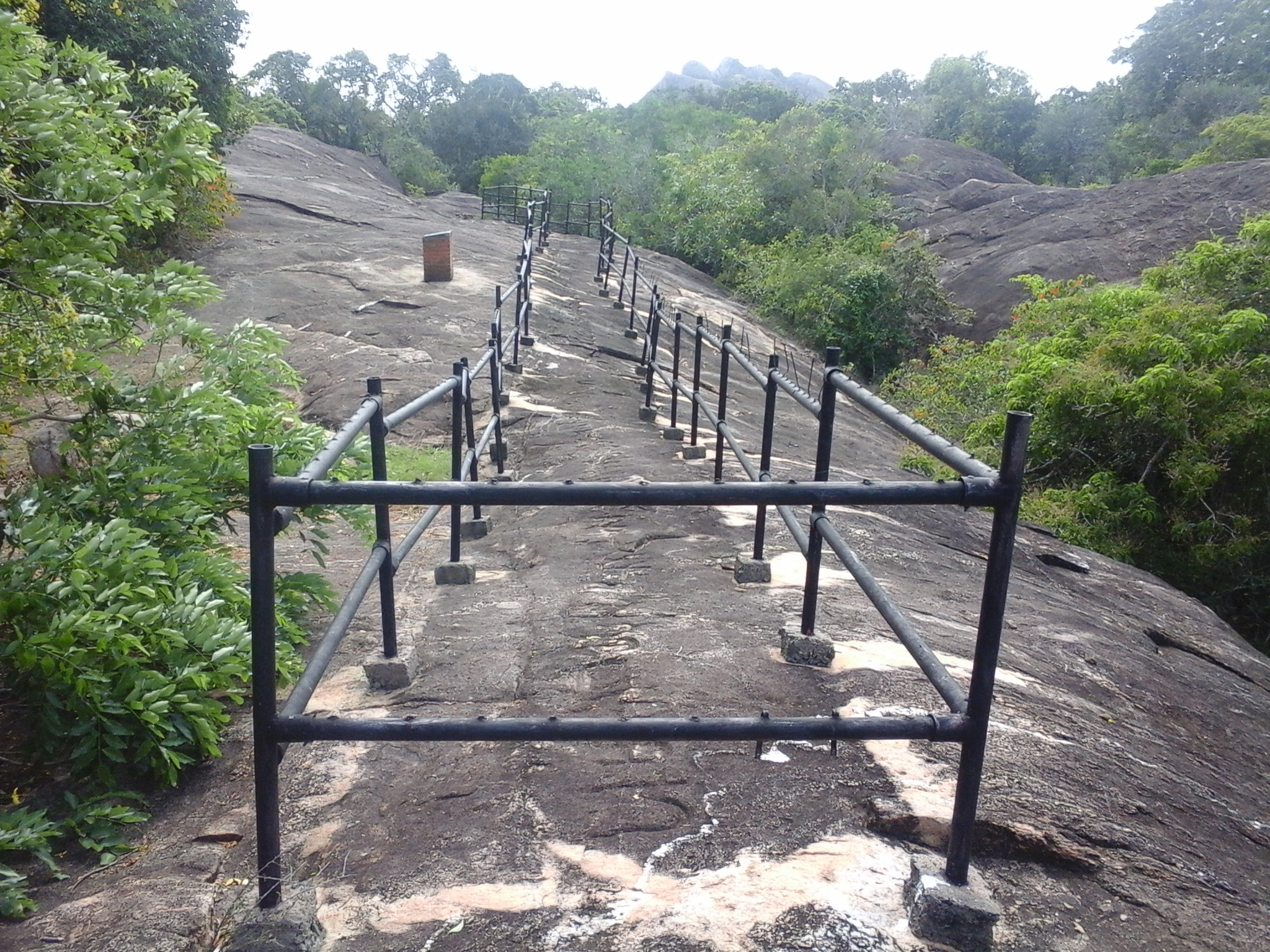
Rock Inscription number 2

=== Inscription # 1 ===
Reign: Gamani Abhaya
Period: 1st century AD
Script: Early Brahmi
Language: Helu Prakrit
Content: Parumaka Abaya puta parumaka Tisaha vapi acagirika Tisa pavatahi agata anagata catudisa sagasa dine. Devana pi maharaja Gamiṇi Abaye niyate acanagaraka ca [tavi]rikiya nagaraka ca. Parumaka Abaya puta parumaka Tisa niyata pite rajaha agata anagata catudisa sagasa.
Translation: "The tank of the chief Tissa, son of the chief Abhaya was donated to the sangha of the four quartes present and absent, in the monastery of Acchagirika Tissa pabbata. The great King Gamini Abhaya dedicated Acchanagaraka and Tavirikiya-nagaraka to the monastery. These donations, the chief Abhaya, caused to be dedicated by the king to the sangha of the four quarters, present and absent"

=== Inscription # 2 ===
Reign: Gamani Abhaya
Period: 1st century AD
Script: Early Brahmi
Language: Helu Prakrit
Content: Parumaka Abaya puta parumaka Tisa niyate. Ima vapi acagirika Tisa pavatahi agata anagata catudisa sagasa. Devana piya maharaje Gamiṇi Abaye niyate acanagaraka ca tavirikiya nagaraka ca acagirika Tisa pavatahi agata anagata catudisa sagusa. Parumaka Abaya puta parumaka Tisaha visara niyate pite.
Translation: "This tank has been donated by Lord Tissa, the son of Lord Abhaya; and two places named Achanagaraka and Tawirikiya have been donated by King Gamini Abhaya to the monks of Achagirika Tissa Pabbata temple"

== See also ==
- List of Archaeological Protected Monuments in Sri Lanka
