= Magadhi Prakrit =

Written language of Ancient India

- Māgadhī
- Brahmi: 𑀫𑀸𑀕𑀥𑀻
- Region: India
- Extinct: developed into the Eastern Indo-Aryan languages
- Language family: Indo-European: Indo-Iranian; Indo-Aryan; Magadhi Prakrit

Language codes
- ISO 639-3: –
- Glottolog: None

Magadhi Prakrit (Māgadhī) is of one of the three Dramatic Prakrits, the written languages of Classical-Medieval India following the decline of Pali. It was a vernacular Middle Indo-Aryan language, replacing earlier Vedic Sanskrit.

== History and overview ==
Magadhi Prakrit was spoken in the eastern Indian subcontinent, in a region spanning what is now eastern India, Bangladesh and Nepal. Associated with the ancient Magadha, it was spoken in present-day Assam, Bengal, Bihar, Jharkhand, Odisha and eastern Uttar Pradesh under various Apabhraṃśa and Apabhraṣṭa dialects, and used in some Prakrit dramas to represent vernacular dialogue. It is believed to be the language spoken by the important religious figures Gautama Buddha and Mahavira and was also the language of the courts of the Magadha Mahajanapada and the Maurya Empire; some of the Edicts of Ashoka were composed in it.

Magadhi Prakrit later evolved into the Eastern Indo-Aryan languages, categorised into four groups:

- Bengali–Assamese
- Bihari
- Halbic
- Odia
