= Sandeśarāsaka =

Apabhraṃśa epic by Addahamāṇa

The Sandēśarāsaka (meaning Message Poem), also known by its Apabhraṃśa name Saṁnēharāsaya, (Sanskrit: सन्देशरासक, Apabhraṃśa: संनेहरासय) is an epic poem often dated to around the 11th century by Addahamāṇa (the Apabhraṃśa form of the name Abdur Rahman), a Multani (known as Mulasthana) poet, in Apabhramsha. Its language is considered to be a version of Apabhraṃśa, the language that gave rise to modern Northwestern Indo-Aryan languages like Punjabi and Sindhi.

The manuscripts of the book were discovered in Jain libraries by Muni Jinavijaya. According to Muni Jinavijaya, the work was written before the conquest by Ghiyath al-Din Muhammad Ghori in 1192, when Multan was still a major Hindu pilgrimage centre. The manuscripts include Sanskrit explanations by a Jain scholar in Vikram Samvat 1465 (circa 1408–09 C.E.).

== Dating ==
The work is dated to various centuries by different authors:

- According to Bhardwaj (2016), the author of the work flourished in the 11th century
- Roberts (1999) dates the author of the work to the 12th century, with Asif (2016) claiming his Sandeśarāsaka was written in the late 12th century, being compiled near Jaisalmer
- Ollet (2017) dates the work to the 13th century, with Flood (2022) dating it to the early 13th century

== Manuscripts ==
Various manuscripts of the work have been discovered:

- Bhandarkar Oriental Research Institute, Ms. no. 181 of 1881–1882, 12 leaves, written in Jain Devanāgarī. Scribed by Paṃ. Nayasamudra.
- Ms. from Jñānabhaṇḍār of Ācārya Śrī Jinaharisāgarjī at Lohāvaṭ in Marwar. 28 leaves. Completed at Hisāradurga (Hisar fort in Haryana) on the 8th day of the bright half of Āṣādha, Wednesday. Scribed by Lakṣmīcandra based on a lecture by Gāhaḍa. Completed in 1465 VS (c. 1408–1409).
- Ms. from a Bhaṇḍār at Pātan. 17 leaves, written in Jain Devanāgarī. Copied by Muni Mānasāgara, dating to 1700–1750 VS (c. 1643–1694 CE)
- Ms. held at the library of Śvetāmbara Sādhumārgī Jaina Hitakāriṇī Saṃsthā, Bīkānera, dating to VS 1633 (c. 1576–1577)

== Theme ==
This epic poem is inspired by Meghaduta of Kalidasa, with Meghaduta involving sacred geography while the Sandeśarāsaka consists of mercantile geography, consisting of Uch and Cholistan fortresses. The story involves a message from a husband to a wife via a cloud. While Kalidasa's work involves the message travelling from Ramagiri to Alaka, Addahamāṇa's work involves a route from Multan to Cambay. Furthermore, the Meghadūta focuses on the male yaksha while the Sandeśarāsaka centres on a female virahini.

The author invoked God using an expression that combines Hindu and Muslim perspectives:

माणुस्सदुव्वविज्जाहरेहिं णहमग्गि सूर ससि बिंबे।
आएहिं जो णमिज्जइ तं णयरे णमह कत्तारं।

māṇussaduvvavijjāharēhiṃ ṇahamaggi sūra sasi biṃbē.
āēhiṃ jō ṇamijjai taṃ ṇayarē ṇamaha kattāraṃ.

In Shahmukhi,

مَاݨُسَّدُوَّوِجَّاہَریہِں ݨَہَمَگِّ سُورَ سَسِ بِن٘بے ۔
آئیہِں جو ݨَمِجَّئِ تَں ݨَیَرے ݨَمَہَ کَتَّارَں ۔

In Gurmukhi,

ਮਾਣੁੱਸਦੁੱਵਵਿੱਜਾਹਰੇਹਿੰ ਣਹਮੱਗਿ ਸੂਰ ਸਸਿ ਬਿੰਬੇ।
ਆਏਹਿੰ ਜੋ ਣਮਿੱਜਇ ਤੰ ਣਯਰੇ ਣਮਹ ਕੱਤਾਰੰ।

Translation,

O citizens, salute the creator who is saluted by men, gods, vidyadharas, the sun and the moon.

== Cultural influence ==
It is the only work by a Muslim in Apabhramsha, and it is a precursor of Baba Farid and books like Padmavat of Malik Muhammad Jayasi.

It is the first book that refers to a vernacular work based on the Ramayana.

Two of the verses were quoted by Acharya Hemachandra (1088-1173).

== See also ==
- Padmavat
