= Ashokan Prakrit =

Ancient Indo-Aryan dialect continuum

- Asokan Prakrit, Aśokan Prakrit
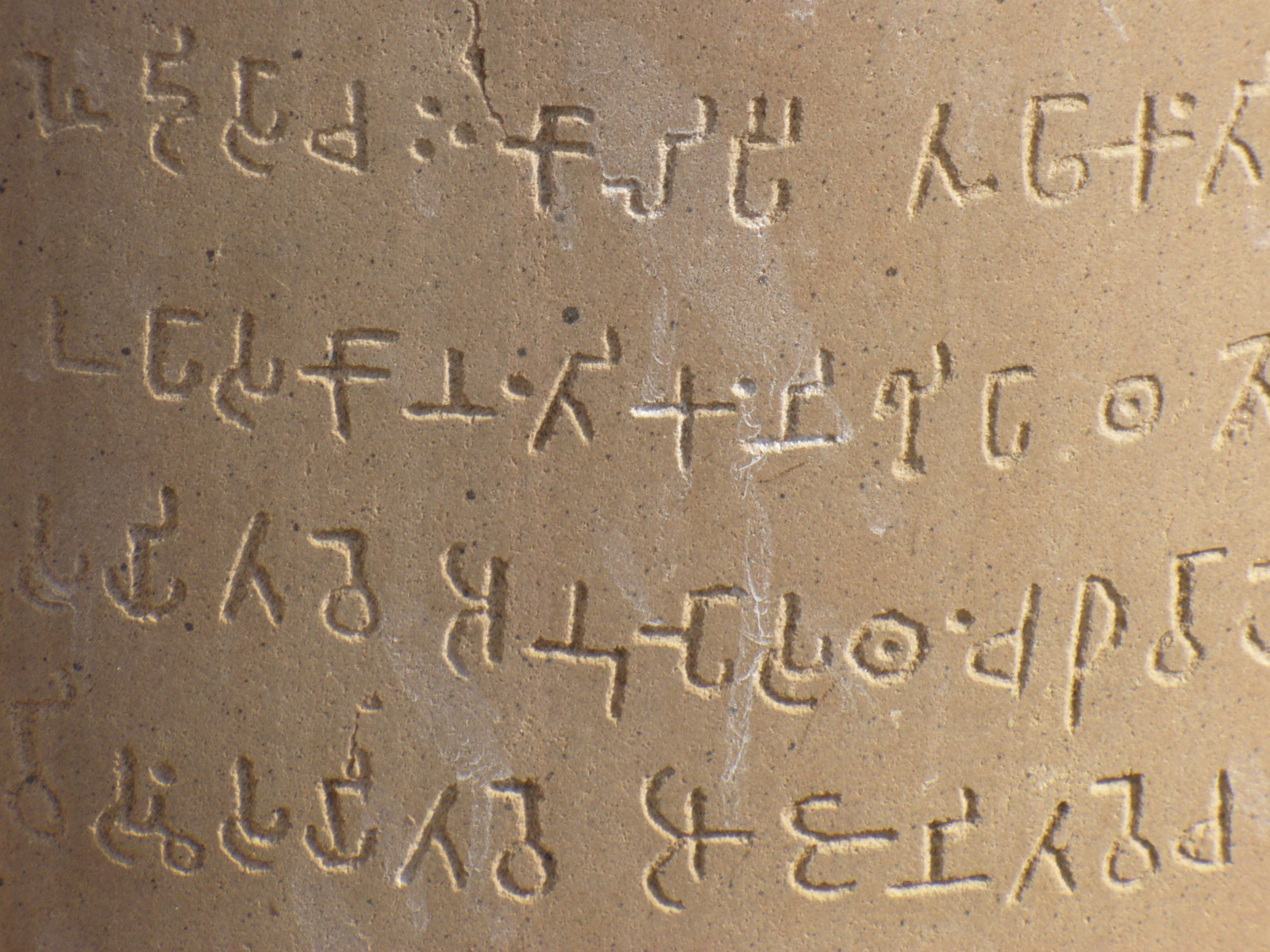
- Ashokan Prakrit inscribed in the Brahmi script at Sarnath.
- Native to: Maurya Empire
- Region: South Asia
- Era: 268—232 BCE
- Language family: Indo-European: Indo-Iranian; Indo-Aryan; Ashokan Prakrit
- Early forms: Proto-Indo-European: Proto-Indo-Iranian; Proto-Indo-Aryan
- Writing system: Brahmi, Kharoshthi

Language codes
- ISO 639-3: None (mis)
- Glottolog: None
- Location of the Minor Rock Edicts (Edicts 1, 2 & 3); Other inscriptions often classified as Minor Rock Edicts; Location of the Major Rock Edicts; Location of the Minor Pillar Edicts; Original location of the Major Pillar Edicts; Capital cities

Ashokan Prakrit, also known as Asokan Prakrit or Aśokan Prakrit (IAST: Aśoka Prākṛta), is the Middle Indo-Aryan dialect continuum used in the Edicts of Ashoka, attributed to Emperor Ashoka of the Mauryan Empire who reigned 268 BCE to 232 BCE. The Edicts are inscriptions on monumental pillars and rocks throughout the Indian subcontinent that cover Ashoka's conversion to Buddhism and espouse Buddhist principles (e.g. upholding dhamma and ahimsa).

The Ashokan Prakrit dialects reflected local forms of the Early Middle-Indo-Aryan language. Three dialect areas are represented: Northwestern, Western, and Eastern. The Central dialect of Indo-Aryan is exceptionally not represented; instead, inscriptions of that area use the Eastern forms. Ashokan Prakrit is descended from an Old Indo-Aryan dialect closely related to Vedic Sanskrit, on occasion diverging by preserving archaisms from Proto-Indo-Aryan.

Ashokan Prakrit is attested in the Brahmi script, as well as the Kharoshthi script in the north-west.

== Classification ==
Masica classifies Ashokan Prakrit as an Early Middle-Indo-Aryan language, representing the earliest stage after Old Indo-Aryan in the historical development of Indo-Aryan.

== Dialects ==
There are three dialect groups attested in the Ashokan Edicts, based on phonological and grammatical idiosyncrasies which correspond with developments in later Middle Indo-Aryan languages:

- Western: The inscriptions at Girnar and Sopara, which: prefer r over l; do not merge the nasal consonants (n, ñ, ṇ); merge all sibilants into s; prefer (c)ch as the reflex of the Old Indo-Aryan thorn cluster kṣ; have -o as the nominative singular of masculine a-stems, among other morphological peculiarities. Notably, this dialect corresponds well with Pali, the preferred Middle Indo-Aryan language of Buddhism. According to Turner, the inscription at Girnar is closer to Marathi than to Gujarati, and posits "Proto-Marathi" speakers previously had a more northernly presence.
- Northwestern: The inscriptions at Shahbazgarhi and Mansehra written in the Kharosthi script: retain etymological r and l as distinct; do not merge the nasals; do not merge the sibilants (s, ś, ṣ); metathesis of liquids in consonant clusters (e.g. Sanskrit dharma > Shahbazgarhi dhrama). These features are shared with the modern Dardic languages.
- Eastern: The standard administrative language, exemplified by the inscriptions at Dhauli and Jaugada and used in the geographical core of the Mauryan Empire: prefer l over r, merge the nasals into n (and geminate ṁn), prefer (k)kh as the reflex of OIA kṣ, have -e as the nominative singular of masculine a-stems, etc. Oberlies suggests that the inscriptions in the Central zone were translated from the "official" administrative forms of the Edicts.

=== Sample ===
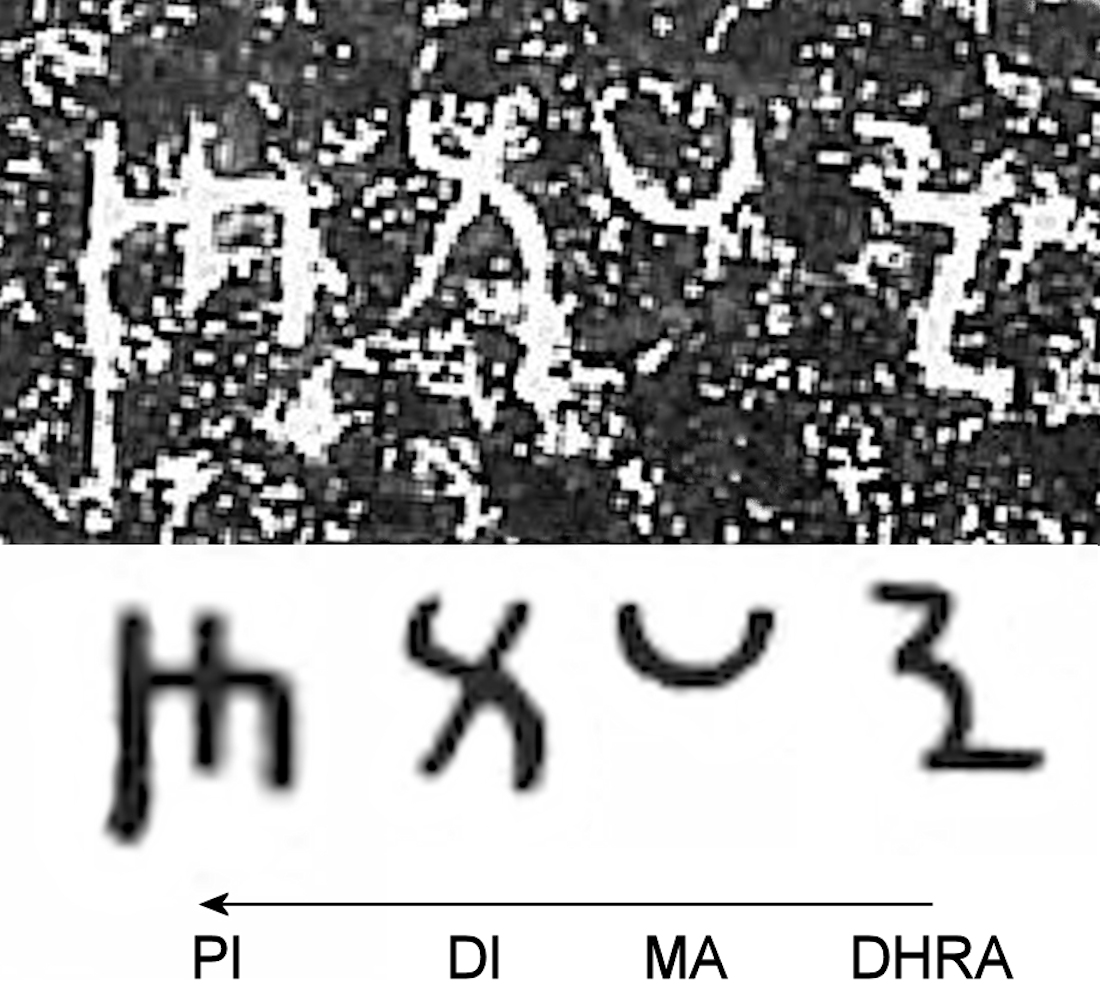
Dhrama-dipi "rescript on morality" in Ashokan Prakrit in the Kharoshthi script at Shahbazgarhi.

The following is the first sentence of the Major Rock Edict 1, inscribed c. 257 BCE in many locations.

- Girnar:

iy[aṃ] dhaṃma-lipī Devānaṃpriyena Priyadasinā rāña lekhāpitā
this morality-rescript Devānāṁpriya.INS Priyadarśin.INS king.INS write.CAUS.PTC
'This rescript on morality has been caused to be written by king Devānāṁpriya Priyadarśin.'

- Kalsi:

iyaṃ dhaṃma-lipi Devānaṃpiyena Piyadas[i]nā [lekhit]ā
this morality-rescript Devānāṁpriya.INS Priyadarśin.INS write.PTC

- Shahbazgarhi:

[aya] dhrama-dipi Devanapriasa raño likhapitu
this morality-rescript Devānāṁpriya.GEN king.GEN write.CAUS.PTC

- Mansehra:

ayi dhra[ma]dip[i] Devanaṃ[priye]na Priya[draśina rajina li]khapita
this morality-rescript Devānāṁpriya.INS Priyadarśin.INS king.INS write.CAUS.PTC

- Dhauli:

... [si pava]tasi [D]e[v]ā[na]ṃp[iy] ... [nā lājina l]i[kha] ...
... LOC mountain.LOC Devānāṁpriya.INS ... INS king.INS write.PTC ...

- Jaugada:

iyaṃ dhaṃma-lipi Khepi[ṃ]galasi pavatasi Devānaṃpiyena Piyadasinā lājinā likhāpitā
this morality-rescript Khepiṅgala.LOC mountain.LOC Devānāṁpriya.INS Priyadarśin.INS king.INS write.CAUS.PTC

The dialect groups and their differences are apparent: the Northwest retains clusters but does metathesis on liquids (dhrama vs. other dhaṃma) and retains an earlier form dipi "writing" borrowed from Iranian. Meanwhile, the l ~ r distinctions are apparent in the word for "king" (Girnar rāña but Jaugada lājinā).
