= Apabhraṃśa =

Class of Indian languages

- अवहंस
- The word "Apabhraṃśa" written in Devanagari script
- Native to: India and Nepal
- Region: Northern India
- Language family: Indo-European: Indo-Iranian; Indo-Aryan; Vedic Sanskrit; Sanskrit; Apabhraṃśa
- Writing system: Devanagari

Language codes
- ISO 639-3: –

Apabhraṃśa (Sanskrit: अपभ्रंश, IPA: [ɐpɐbʱrɐ̃ˈɕɐ], Prakrit: अवहंस Avahaṃsa) is a term used by vaiyākaraṇāḥ (native grammarians) since Patañjali to refer to languages spoken in Northern India before the rise of the modern languages. In Indology, it is used as an umbrella term for the dialects forming the transition between the late Middle and the early Modern Indo-Aryan languages, spanning the period between the 6th and 13th centuries CE. However, these dialects are conventionally included in the Middle Indo-Aryan period. Apabhraṃśa in Sanskrit literally means "corrupt" or "non-grammatical language", that which deviates from the norm of Sanskrit grammar.

Apabhraṃśa literature is a valuable source for the history of Northern India for the period spanning the 12th to 16th centuries.

== Overview ==
The term Prakrit, which includes Pali, is also used as a cover term for the vernaculars of Northern India that were spoken perhaps as late as the 4th to 8th centuries, but some scholars use the term for the entire Middle Indo-Aryan period. Middle Indo-Aryan languages gradually transformed into Apabhraṃśa dialects, which were used until about the 13th century. The Apabhraṃśas later evolved into Modern Indo-Aryan languages. The boundaries of these periods are somewhat hazy, not strictly chronological. Modern Northern Indian languages are often considered to have begun to develop a distinct identity around the 11th century – while Apabhraṃśas were still in use – and became fully distinct by the end of the 12th century.

A significant amount of Apabhraṃśa literature has been found in Jain libraries. While Amir Khusrow and Kabir were writing in a language quite similar to modern Urdu and Hindi, many poets, especially in regions that were still ruled by Hindu kings, continued to write in Apabhraṃśa. These authors include Saraha, Tilopa and Kanha of Kamarupa; Devasena of Dhar (9th century CE); Pushpadanta of Manyakheta (9th century CE); Dhanapal; Muni Ramsimha; Hemachandra of Patan; and Raidhu of Gwalior (15th century CE).

An early example of the use of Apabhraṃśa is the Vikramorvashiyam of Kālidāsa, when Pururavas asks the animals in the forest about his beloved who had disappeared. Compositions in Apabhramsha continued until the 18th century, when Bhagavatidasa wrote Migankaleha Chariu.

The first known example of an Apabhraṃśa work by a Muslim is the Sandeśarāsaka of Abdur Rahman of Multan, possibly written around 1000 CE.

== Writers and poets ==
Below is the list of some of the eminent writers and poets of Apabhraṃśa literature:

- Mahakavi Swyambhudev (8th century CE)

- Ritthanemichariu
- Pauma-Chariu

- Mahakavi Pushpadant (10th century)

- Mahapuran
- Naykumarchariu
- Jasaharchariu

- Hemachandra (12th century)
- Abdur Rahman (Addahamāṇa) (12th century) – Multani poet who penned the epic romance Sandeśarāsaka in Apabhraṃśa.
- Padmanābha who wrote Kanhadade Prabandha (15th century)

== See also ==
- Hindavi
- History of Hindustani
