= List of Archaeological Protected Monuments in Puttalam District =

This is a list of Archaeological Protected Monuments in Puttalam District, Sri Lanka.

Monument	Image	Location	Grama Niladhari Division	Divisional Secretary's Division	Registered	Description	Refs
Bodhi Rukkarama Vihara			Kottukachchiya First Coloney	Anamaduwa	23 January 2009	The Tempita Vihara and dagoba	
Demattapitiya Maha Mankada Ariyakara Vihara			Ariyagama	Chilaw	23 January 2009	The dagoba mound, ancient ruins, and the wooden pillar	
Devramvehera Monastery		Palu Uswewa	No. 231	Kottawehera	6 February 2009	The ancient dagoba mound situated in the land called Deweramvehera Senasana belonging to the Savaragala Teak Reserve	
Kalpitiya Dutch Church			Kalpitiya	Kalpitiya			
Egodagama Nethipokkuna ruins		Egodagama Nethipokkuna	No. 612 -Mohoriya	Mahakumbukkadawala	23 January 2009	The dagoba mound	
Galandayaya ruins			No. 650-Koyiladigama	Anamaduwa	6 June 2008	The seven sites with evidence of ancient buildings in the place called Koyiladigama	
Kalpitiya Fort			Kalpitiya	Kalpitiya			
Karuwalagaswewa purana Vihara			No. 658-C-Diwulwewa	Anamaduwa	6 June 2008	The steps on rock, two drip ledged caves and Kethukavataya	
Karuwalagaswewa purana Vihara			No. 658-C-Diwulwewa	Anamaduwa	23 January 2009	The three drip ledged rock caves, the steps on the natural rock, and the kethukawataya	
Kedetthawa ruins			Gallewa	Anamaduwa	23 January 2009	The dagoba mound and flight of steps on natural rock situated in the village	
Kettharama Vihara			No. 652-B-Maha Uswewa	Anamaduwa	23 January 2009	The dagoba building	
Kettharama Vihara			No. 652-B-Maha Uswewa	Anamaduwa	6 June 2008	The building ruins and stone inscription	
Kiwulagoda ruins			No. 614 -E Kiwulagoda Agricultural Colonization Scheme	Mahakumbukkadawala	23 January 2009	The ruins of the dagoba	
Koraya Walawwa (known as “Sigiri” house)		Chilaw Town		Chilaw	9 September 2011	Former house of Koraya family member	
Kuddetiyawa Sri Sunandarama Vihara			No. 499 A Kuddetiyawa	Nattandiya	24 July 2009	The Image House, Dharmasala (Preaching Hall) and Pohoyageya	
Kummadiyagala Vihara			Diwulwewa	Anamaduwa	23 January 2009	The ancient dagoba mounds, and building ruins	
Labugala Sankadayagama ruins			Diwulwewa	Anamaduwa	23 January 2009	The rock with evidence of antiques with chisel holing therein and buildings with rock drains	
Labugala Vihara			Diwulwewa	Anamaduwa	23 January 2009	The dagoba ruins, five drip ledged rock caves, the steps on the natural rock and evidence of rock inscriptions	
Lihiniyagiri Vihara			Galkuliya	Mahakumbukkadawala	23 January 2009	The dagoba belonging to the Lihiniyagiri Vihare premises and the antiques, stone pillars comprising evidence of buildings	
Maligawatta pond			Kanatthawa	Chilaw	23 January 2009		
Malwila Archaeology Reserve				Vanathavilluwa			
Mangana Raja Maha Vihara			Mukunuwatawana	Chilaw	23 January 2009	The ancient building foundation, ruins, and the mound containing ancient rock pillars	
Manikkanda Raja Maha Vihara		Uriyawa	Uriyawa	Anamaduwa	6 June 2008	Dageba mound, and inscription	
Manikkanda Raja Maha Vihara		Uriyawa	Uriyawa	Anamaduwa	23 January 2009	The dagoba building ruins and rock inscription	
Mulgirigala Raja Maha Vihara				Nawagattegama		Caves with drip ledges and other ruins	
Munneswaram temple			No. 568 - Munneswaram	Chilaw	23 January 2009	The sanctum sanctorum of the temple, internal pathway, the hall with the Sivan Temple building, the Gopura and the pathway wall around the temple, the ancient well, archaeologically important buildings and ancient pond within the precincts of the Munneswaram Sivan Temple	
Nagarama Purana Vihara			524 Mahawewa	Mahawewa	6 June 2008	Tampita vihara	
Nochchiwatawana ruins			No. 569/D, Manuwangama-East	Chilaw	9 September 2011	Archaeological reserve with Terra-Cotta Pottaries and Chaithya mound in the Daduru Oya Valley in Nochchiwatwana Village	
Old buildings in the town				Chilaw	23 January 2009	The Headquarters of the Police investigation Unit, Queen's House of Chilaw, the prison Building of the Dutch and the Surveyor's Camp	
Othappugala Purana Vihara		Kunthanigama	No. 653-C-Periyakulam	Anamaduwa	6 June 2008	The drip ledged cave	
Othappugala Purana Vihara		Kunthanigama	No. 653-C-Periyakulam	Anamaduwa	23 January 2009	Pre-historic rock cave and drip ledged rock cave inscriptions	
Padigalayaya ruins			No. 651-A-Merungoda	Anamaduwa	6 June 2008	The fight of steps on rock in the place called No. 8 Gammana Padigalayaya	
Paramakanda Raja Maha Vihara		Paramakanda		Anamaduwa	1 November 1996	Image house with old paintings	
Paramakanda Raja Maha Vihara		Paramakanda		Anamaduwa	23 January 2009	The ancient dagoba and two drip ledged caves, rock inscription, residence of the Buddha Bhikkus and three drip ledged caves	
Peththigama Purana Vihara			No. 658 A - Walpaluwa	Mahakumbukkadawala	23 January 2009	The ancient dagoba and the seven places containing ruins	
Pichchandiyawa				Nawagattegama		Caves with drip ledges and other ruins	
Sri Sitthi Vinayagar Kovil				Puttalam		The pillayar statue	
Sri Sudarsanarama vihara			No. 653-B-Karambewa	Anamaduwa	6 June 2008	The Tampitta Buddha shrine	
Sri Sudarsanarama vihara			No. 653-B-Karambewa	Anamaduwa	23 January 2009	The Tempita vihare and ancient dagoba	
St. Carmel Church				Chilaw	23 January 2009		
St. James Church				Chilaw	23 January 2009		
St. Mary's Church				Puttalam			
Sumangala Vihara			Dematapitiya	Arachchikattuwa	23 January 2009	The ancient stone pillars, circular building and the ancient brick foundation	
Thaniwelle Devalaya		Mahabaddegama		Madampe	22 November 2002	Bodhi tree and its surrounding premises	
Thinapitiya Tampita Vihara		Mahabaddegama		Madampe			
Thonigala Rock Inscription, Anamaduwa			Thonigala	Anamaduwa	23 January 2009	The Thonigala rock inscriptions	
Thuparama ruins			No. 661-Muthalaikkuli	Anamaduwa	6 June 2008	The dagoba ruins, stone inscriptions and evidence of buildings with stone pillars	
Tissawa Nochchi Watawala ruins				Chilaw	23 January 2009	The seven rock pillars in the Registrar watte situated in the village of Tissawa Nochchi Watawala	
Veherabendi Kele Vihara		Mokkandaluwa		Arachchikattuwa	23 January 2009	The ancient Dagoba mound	
