= Urudayandaluwa Grama Niladhari Division =

Urudayandaluwa
- Grama Niladhari Division
- Interactive map of Urudayandaluwa
- Coordinates: 7.598859°N 79.842303°E
- Country: Sri Lanka
- Province: North Western Province
- District: Puttalam District
- Divisional Secretariat: Chilaw Divisional Secretariat
- Electoral District: Puttalam Electoral District
- Polling Division: Chilaw Polling Division

Area
  - Total: 1.33 km^{2} (0.51 sq mi)
- Elevation: 9 m (30 ft)

Population (2012)
  - Total: 455
  - Density: 342/km^{2} (890/sq mi)
- ISO 3166 code: LK-6233055

Urudayandaluwa

Urudayandaluwa Grama Niladhari Division is a Grama Niladhari Division of the Chilaw Divisional Secretariat of Puttalam District of North Western Province, Sri Lanka. It has Grama Niladhari Division Code 569E.

Urudayandaluwa is a surrounded by the Thittakade, Manuwangama East, Manuwangama West, Nariyagama South, Parappanmulla and Thissogama Grama Niladhari Divisions.

== Demographics ==
=== Ethnicity ===
The Urudayandaluwa Grama Niladhari Division has a Sinhalese majority (99.1%). In comparison, the Chilaw Divisional Secretariat (which contains the Urudayandaluwa Grama Niladhari Division) has a Sinhalese majority (82.4%)

Ethnicity in Urudayandaluwa
1. Sinhalese (99.1%)
2. Other (0.90%)

=== Religion ===
The Urudayandaluwa Grama Niladhari Division has a Roman Catholic majority (59.1%) and a significant Buddhist population (40.7%). In comparison, the Chilaw Divisional Secretariat (which contains the Urudayandaluwa Grama Niladhari Division) has a Roman Catholic plurality (45.7%) and a significant Buddhist population (36.6%)

Religion in Urudayandaluwa
1. Roman Catholic (59.1%)
2. Buddhist (40.7%)
3. Other (0.20%)
