= Maha Vilattawa Grama Niladhari Division =

Maha Vilattawa
- Grama Niladhari Division
- Interactive map of Maha Vilattawa
- Coordinates: 7.608879°N 79.898112°E
- Country: Sri Lanka
- Province: North Western Province
- District: Puttalam District
- Divisional Secretariat: Chilaw Divisional Secretariat
- Electoral District: Puttalam Electoral District
- Polling Division: Chilaw Polling Division

Area
  - Total: 2.28 km^{2} (0.88 sq mi)
- Elevation: 0 m (0 ft)

Population (2012)
  - Total: 775
  - Density: 340/km^{2} (880/sq mi)
- ISO 3166 code: LK-6233040

Maha Vilattawa

Maha Vilattawa Grama Niladhari Division is a Grama Niladhari Division of the Chilaw Divisional Secretariat of Puttalam District of North Western Province, Sri Lanka. It has Grama Niladhari Division Code 570.

Maha Vilattawa is a surrounded by the Bingiriya, Vilattawa Palatha, Weerapandiyana, Elivitiya, Kanattawa, Punchi Vilattawa and Pulliyankadawara Grama Niladhari Divisions.

== Demographics ==
=== Ethnicity ===
The Maha Vilattawa Grama Niladhari Division has a Sinhalese majority (99.9%). In comparison, the Chilaw Divisional Secretariat (which contains the Maha Vilattawa Grama Niladhari Division) has a Sinhalese majority (82.4%)

Ethnicity in Maha Vilattawa
1. Sinhalese (99.9%)
2. Other (0.10%)

=== Religion ===
The Maha Vilattawa Grama Niladhari Division has a Buddhist majority (83.9%) and a significant Roman Catholic population (14.2%). In comparison, the Chilaw Divisional Secretariat (which contains the Maha Vilattawa Grama Niladhari Division) has a Roman Catholic plurality (45.7%) and a significant Buddhist population (36.6%)

Religion in Maha Vilattawa
1. Buddhist (83.9%)
2. Roman Catholic (14.2%)
3. Other Christian (1.70%)
4. Other (0.30%)
