= Puruduwella =

- Location in Sri Lanka
- Coordinates: 7°28′N 79°52′E
- Country: Sri Lanka
- Province: North Western Province
- District: Puttalam District
- Time zone: +5.30
- Postal code: 61226

Puruduwella (Sinhala: පුරුදුවැල්ල) is a village in Mahawewa Divisional Secretariat in Puttalam District in North Western Province, Sri Lanka. There is river called Kadupiti Oya in one boundary of the village. There are also two buddhist temples Pushparamaya and Subadraramaya in the village.

The meaning of the village name in Sinhala is "the sand where the training was held". One explanation for the village's name is that King Thaniyavallabha, who administered this district from 1489 until 1513 may have used this village to train his horses
