= Thillayadi =

Thillayadi තිල්ලයඩි தில்லையடி
- Town
- Location in Sri Lanka
- Coordinates: 8°00′29″N 79°50′18″E
- Country: Sri Lanka
- Province: North Western Province
- District: Puttalam
- Time zone: +5.30

Thillayadi (Sinhala: තිල්ලයඩි, Tamil: தில்லையடி) is a town located in Puttalam District, North Western Province, Sri Lanka. It is a multi-cultural community. The town's population consists mainly of Muslims.

Thillayadi is located near Puttalam and the A3 Highway (Puttalam-Colombo Road).

== Schools ==
- Thillayadi Muslim Maha Vidhyalaya
- Annsari Muslim Maha Vidhyalaya

== Temples ==
- Thillayadi Mohideen Jumma Masjith
- Vellankanni Church
- Thillayadi Murugan Kovil
