= Godatale =

Coordinates: 7°21′N 80°26′E

- Village
- Interactive map of Godatale
- Country: Sri Lanka
- Province: North Western Province
- Time zone: UTC+5:30 (Sri Lanka Standard Time)

Godatale is a village in the North Western Province of Sri Lanka.

== See also ==
- List of towns in North Western Province, Sri Lanka
