= Mirissala =

Coordinates: 7°27′N 80°33′E

- Village
- Interactive map of Mirissala
- Country: Sri Lanka
- Province: North Western Province
- Time zone: UTC+5:30 (Sri Lanka Standard Time)

Mirissala is a village in Sri Lanka. It is located within North Western Province in Kurunegala District. It is postal to Pihimbuwa. It is entitled to Dodamgaslanda electorate. Mirissala is administrated by Rideegama divisional secretariat. Mirissala kanishta vidyalaya is a school in Ibbagamuwa educational zone. It is about 41 km away from Kurunegala and 30 km from Kandy. It is situated 4 km from Ankumbura.

== See also ==
- List of settlements in North Western Province (Sri Lanka)
