= Ihalagama Niyangama =

Coordinates: 7°26′N 80°32′E

- Village
- Interactive map of Ihalagama Niyangama
- Country: Sri Lanka
- Province: North Western Province
- District: Kurunegala District
- Time zone: UTC+5:30 (Sri Lanka Standard Time)

Ihalagama Niyangama is a village in Sri Lanka. It is located within North Western Province.

== See also ==
- List of settlements in North Western Province (Sri Lanka)
