= Kalotuwawa =

Coordinates: 7°21′N 80°26′E

- Village
- Interactive map of Kalotuwawa
- Country: Sri Lanka
- Province: North Western Province
- District: Kurunegala District
- Time zone: UTC+5:30 (Sri Lanka Standard Time)

Kalotuwawa is a village in Sri Lanka. It is located within North Western Province.

== See also ==
- List of towns in North Western Province, Sri Lanka
