= Wayikkal =

Coordinates: 7°17′N 79°51′E

- Village
- Interactive map of Wayikkal
- Country: Sri Lanka
- Province: North Western Province
- Time zone: UTC+5:30 (Sri Lanka Standard Time)

Wayikkal is a village in Sri Lanka. It is located within North Western Province.

== See also ==
- List of towns in North Western Province, Sri Lanka
