= Waikkal =

Waikkala
- Small town
- Interactive map of Waikkala
- Coordinates: 7°17′N 79°51′E
- Country: Sri Lanka
- Province: North Western Province
- Elevation: 43 ft (13 m)
- Time zone: UTC+5:30 (Sri Lanka Standard Time)

Waikkala is a village in Sri Lanka. It is located within North Western Province.

Waikkal is famous for Tiles and Traditional Iron works.

There is small train Station with a very short platform .Station always locked around 20:15 hours.This train station is very close to the Colombo -Puttlam Main Road (A3).

== See also ==
- List of towns in North Western Province, Sri Lanka
