= Karaitivu =

Karaitivu (Tamil: காரைதீவு) may refer to

- Karaitivu (Ampara), a town in Ampara District, Sri Lanka
- Karaitivu (Jaffna), an island in Jaffna District, Sri Lanka
- Karaitivu (Puttalam), a village in Puttalam District, Sri Lanka
