= Karuwalagaswewa Divisional Secretariat =

- Divisional Secretariat
- Interactive map of Karuwalagaswewa Divisional Secretariat
- Country: Sri Lanka
- Province: North Western Province
- District: Puttalam District
- Time zone: UTC+5:30 (Sri Lanka Standard Time)

Karuwalagaswewa Divisional Secretariat is a Divisional Secretariat of Puttalam District, of North Western Province, Sri Lanka.

== Demography-Religion ==
Religion in Karuwalagaswewa DS Division (2012)
1. Buddhist (91.3%)
2. Hindu (0.20%)
3. Muslim (0.10%)
4. Roman Catholic (7.60%)
5. Other Christian (0.80%)
6. Other (0.00%)
