= Pallama Divisional Secretariat =

- Divisional Secretariat
- Interactive map of Pallama Divisional Secretariat
- Country: Sri Lanka
- Province: North Western Province
- District: Puttalam District
- Time zone: UTC+5:30 (Sri Lanka Standard Time)

Pallama Divisional Secretariat is a Divisional Secretariat of Puttalam District, of North Western Province, Sri Lanka.

== Demography-Religion ==
Religion in Pallama DS Division (2012)
1. Buddhist (68.4%)
2. Hindu (1.00%)
3. Muslim (16.3%)
4. Roman Catholic (13.3%)
5. Other Christian (1.10%)
6. Other (0.00%)
