= Wennappuwa Divisional Secretariat =

- Divisional Secretariat
- Interactive map of Wennappuwa Divisional Secretariat
- Country: Sri Lanka
- Province: North Western Province
- District: Puttalam District
- Time zone: UTC+5:30 (Sri Lanka Standard Time)

Wennappuwa Divisional Secretariat is a Divisional Secretariat of Puttalam District, of North Western Province, Sri Lanka.

== Demography-Religion ==
Religion in Wennappuwa DS Division (2012)
1. Buddhist (18.0%)
2. Hindu (1.20%)
3. Muslim (0.20%)
4. Roman Catholic (78.4%)
5. Other Christian (2.20%)
6. Other (0.00%)
