= A3 road (Sri Lanka) =

Road in Sri Lanka

Coordinates: 7.471859°N 79.828354°E

A3 highway

Route information
- Maintained by Road Development Authority
- Length: 126.31 km (78.49 mi)

Major junctions
- North end: Puttalam
- Ja-ela - A33 Katunayake - E03
- South end: Peliyagoda (merging into A1)

Location
- Country: Sri Lanka
- Major cities: Ja-ela Katunayake Negombo Chilaw

Highway system
- Roads in Sri Lanka; Expressways; A-Grade; B-Grade

The A3 Highway is an A-Grade trunk road in Sri Lanka. It connects the Peliyagoda with Puttalam via Negombo.

The highway A3 passes through Peliyagoda, Wattala, Mahabage, Kandana, Ja-Ela, Seeduwa, Katunayake, Negombo, Kochchikade, Bolawatte, Wennapuwa, Katuneriya, Marawila, Mahawewa, Madampe, Kakkapalliya, Chilaw, Arachchikattu, Battuluoya, Mundel, Madurankuliya and Palavi to reach Puttalam.
