= Dankotuwa Divisional Secretariat =

- Divisional Secretariat
- Interactive map of Dankotuwa Divisional Secretariat
- Country: Sri Lanka
- Province: North Western Province
- District: Puttalam District
- Time zone: UTC+5:30 (Sri Lanka Standard Time)

Dankotuwa Divisional Secretariat is a Divisional Secretariat of Puttalam District, of North Western Province, Sri Lanka.

== Demography-Religion ==
Religion in Dankotuwa DS Division (2012)
1. Buddhist (66.8%)
2. Hindu (1.20%)
3. Muslim (0.60%)
4. Roman Catholic (29.8%)
5. Other Christian (1.60%)
6. Other (0.00%)
