= Baburugama =

- Village
- Location within Sri Lanka
- Coordinates: 7°26′0″N 80°15′0″E
- Country: Sri Lanka
- Province: North Western Province
- Time zone: UTC+5:30 (SLT)

Baburugama is a village in Sri Lanka. It is located within North Western Province.

== See also ==
- List of towns in North Western Province, Sri Lanka
