= Mundalama Divisional Secretariat =

Mundalama Divisional Secretariat මුන්දලම ප්‍රාදේශීය ලේකම් කොට්ඨාසය
- Divisional Secretariat
- Interactive map of Mundalama Divisional Secretariat
- Country: Sri Lanka
- Province: North Western Province
- District: Puttalam District

Area
  - Total: 221 km^{2} (85 sq mi)

Population (2012)
  - Total: 61,638
  - Density: 279/km^{2} (722/sq mi)
- Time zone: UTC+5:30 (Sri Lanka Standard Time)

Mundalama Divisional Secretariat is a Divisional Secretariat of Puttalam District, of North Western Province, Sri Lanka.

== Demography-Religion ==
Religion in Mundalama DS Division (2012)
1. Buddhist (16.7%)
2. Hindu (15.1%)
3. Muslim (38.6%)
4. Roman Catholic (28.9%)
5. Other Christian (0.80%)
6. Other (0.00%)
