= Lenawa =

Village in Kurunegala, Sri Lanka

Lenawa: Sinhala: ලේනව; Tamil: லெனாவா
- Village
- Location within Sri Lanka
- Coordinates: 7°37′55″N 80°28′42″E
- Country: Sri Lanka
- Province: North Western Province
- District: Kurunegala District
- Time zone: UTC+5:30 (SLST)
- Postal Code: 60546
- Area code: 037

Lenawa is a village in the Kurunegala District, located in the North Western Province of Sri Lanka.

== See also ==
- List of settlements in North Western Province
