= St. Xavier's College, Marawila =

St Xavier's College, Marawila

Location
- Marawila, Puttalam District; Sri Lanka
- Coordinates: 7.415841°N 79.831059°E

Information
- School type: Public National 1AB
- Opened: 1942
- School district: Puttalam Education Zone
- Authority: Ministry of Education
- Gender: Boys
- Age range: 5-18

St Xavier's College, Marawila is a boys public national school in Puttalam District, Sri Lanka.

== See also ==
- List of schools in North Western Province, Sri Lanka
- List of Jesuit sites
