= Mulgirigala Raja Maha Vihara =

Ancient Buddhist temple in Sri Lanka

- මුල්ගිරිගල රජ මහා විහාරය
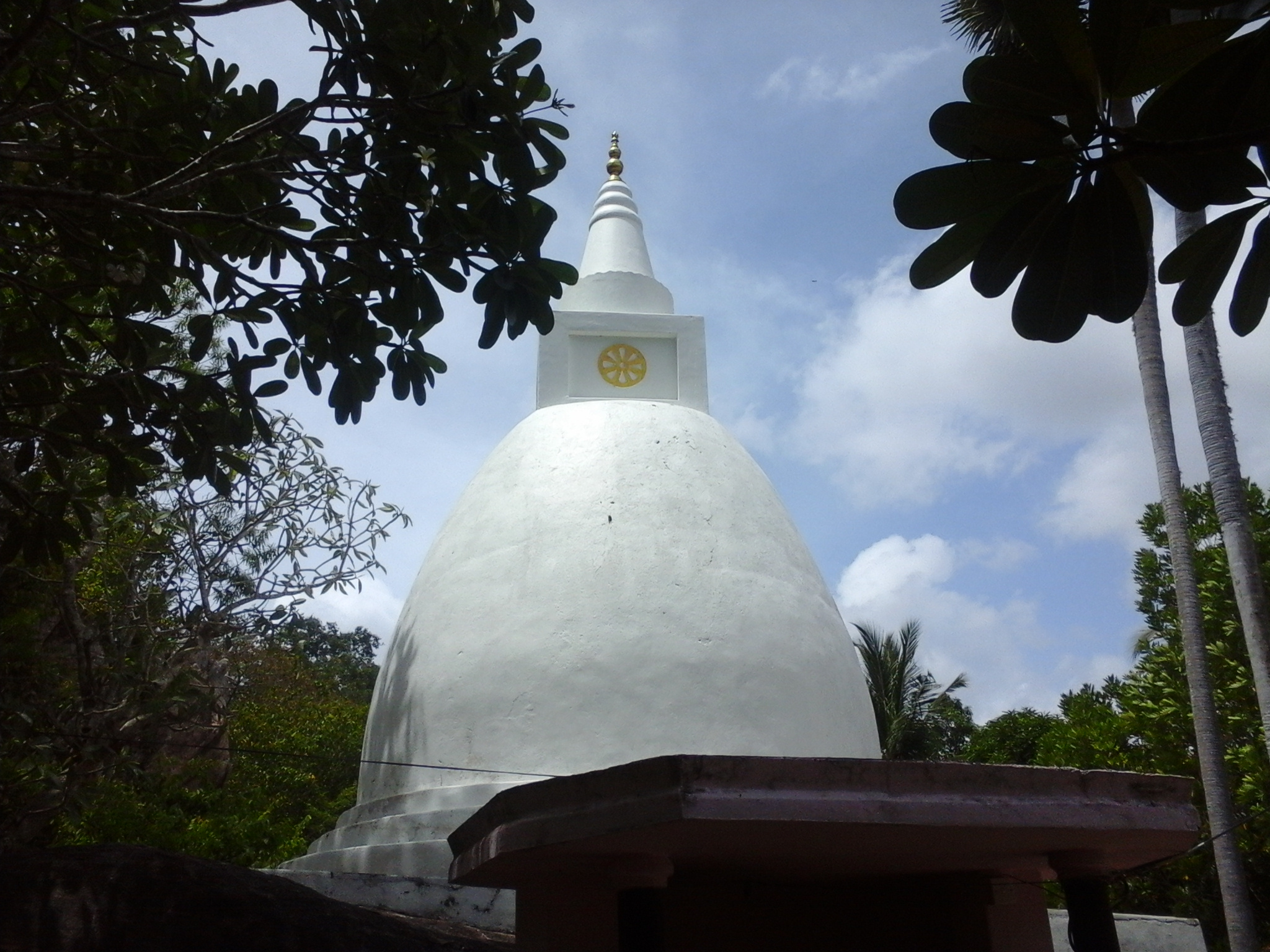
- The Stupa at the lower Vihara premises

Religion
- Affiliation: Buddhism
- District: Puttalam
- Province: North Western Province, Sri Lanka

Location
- Location: Mullegama, Sri Lanka
- Interactive map of Mulgirigala Raja Maha Vihara
- Coordinates: 07°59′08.0″N 80°05′12.9″E

Architecture
- Type: Buddhist Temple
- Founder: King Dappula

Mulgirigala Raja Maha Vihara (Sinhalaː මුල්ගිරිගල රජ මහා විහාරය) is an ancient Buddhist temple in Puttalam District, Sri Lanka. The temple is situated at Mullegama village, about 2.5 km (1.6 mi) far from the Nawagattegama town. The temple has been formally recognised by the Government as an archaeological site in Sri Lanka. It is believed that the temple was built by King Dappula during the Anuradhapura period. The monastery complex consisted of a number of caves and inscriptions, constructed about 300 years ago.
