= Maha Danvila =

Village in Sri Lanka

Maha Danvil is a village in the North Western Province of Sri Lanka. It has two temples.
