= Mundel =

Coordinates: 7°49′N 79°49′E

Mundel මුන්දලම முந்தல்
- Village
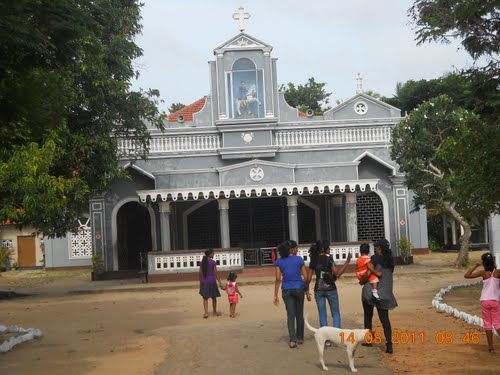
- Interactive map of Mundel
- Country: Sri Lanka
- Province: North Western Province
- District: Puttalam District

Population
  - Total: 5,000
- Time zone: UTC+5:30 (Sri Lanka Standard Time)
- Postal Code: 61250

Mundel (also called Mundalama) is a village located in the Puttalam District.
