= Madampe Divisional Secretariat =

- Divisional Secretariat
- Interactive map of Madampe Divisional Secretariat
- Country: Sri Lanka
- Province: North Western Province
- District: Puttalam District
- Time zone: UTC+5:30 (Sri Lanka Standard Time)

Madampe Divisional Secretariat is a Divisional Secretariat of Puttalam District, of North Western Province, Sri Lanka.

== Demography-Religion ==
Religion in Madampe DS Division (2012)
1. Buddhist (72.6%)
2. Hindu (1.40%)
3. Muslim (5.70%)
4. Roman Catholic (17.3%)
5. Other Christian (2.90%)
6. Other (0.00%)
