= Nattandiya Divisional Secretariat =

- Divisional Secretariat
- Interactive map of Nattandiya Divisional Secretariat
- Country: Sri Lanka
- Province: North Western Province
- District: Puttalam District

Area
  - Total: 72 km^{2} (28 sq mi)

Population (2012)
  - Total: 62,145
  - Density: 860/km^{2} (2,200/sq mi)
- Time zone: UTC+5:30 (Sri Lanka Standard Time)

Nattandiya Divisional Secretariat is a Divisional Secretariat of Puttalam District, of North Western Province, Sri Lanka.

== Demography-Religion ==
Religion in Nattandiya DS Division (2012)
1. Buddhist (45.4%)
2. Hindu (1.70%)
3. Muslim (10.6%)
4. Roman Catholic (40.6%)
5. Other Christian (1.60%)
6. Other (0.00%)
