= Galagedara =

Galagedara may refer to:

- Galagedara, Central Province, Sri Lanka
- Galagedara, Western Province, Sri Lanka
