= Arachchikattuwa Divisional Secretariat =

- Divisional Secretariat
- Interactive map of Arachchikattuwa Divisional Secretariat
- Coordinates: 7°41′30″N 79°50′50″E
- Country: Sri Lanka
- Province: North Western Province
- District: Puttalam District
- Time zone: UTC+5:30 (Sri Lanka Standard Time)

Arachchikattuwa Divisional Secretariat is a Divisional Secretariat of Puttalam District, of North Western Province, Sri Lanka. It is around 157.8 sq. km in size of the area. This is consist of 33 GN divisions. The main sources of living are farming, animal husbandry, and farming.

== History ==
The history of Arachchikattuwa is extend back to 12th century. In some stories it says it was even before that. According to the history there was a well established settlements near the Daduru oya. After that those have expanded towards the Sengal oya and Rathabala oya. There are many historical facts found in the era of Great King Parakramabahu.

== Religious Background ==
Arachchikattuwa area is multi-religious and multi ethnic area. The main population is Buddhist, with many Hindus and Catholics. In addition to these, there are some Islamic and other Christian followers.

=== Demography-Religion ===
Religion in Arachchikattuwa DS Division (2012)
1. Buddhist (60.6%)
2. Hindu (3.10%)
3. Muslim (0.40%)
4. Roman Catholic (33.9%)
5. Other Christian (1.90%)
6. Other (0.10%)
