= Pallama =

- Town
- Country: Sri Lanka
- Province: North Western Province, Sri Lanka
- Time zone: UTC+5:30 (Sri Lanka Standard Time)

Pallama is a small town in Puttalam District, located in the North Western Province, Sri Lanka.

== See also ==
- List of towns in Central Province, Sri Lanka
