= Malwila Ruins =

The Malwila Raja Maha Vihara is an ancient monastery situated at Saliya Pura, Wanatawilluwa in the Puttalam District of north western Sri Lanka. It is located two miles from the turnoff to the right at Karadipuwa, which could be reached after travelling nine miles on the Puttalam–Mannar Road.

According to folklore prevalent in the area, the monastery had been built by Prince Saliya, son of King Dutugemunu the Great. This sacred site has ruins of a Dagoba, three buildings with stone pillars, a structure that could be identified as a Bodhighara, a stone Buddha statue, moonstones signifying the entrances to buildings and a flight of steps with a balustrade.

The ruins of the Dagoba could be climbed and on top of it a rare octagonal pillar could be seen. The ruins have been victims of treasure hunters. Presently it is guarded by the Civil Defence Force.
