= Bakmeegolla =

Coordinates: 7°32′N 80°26′E

Bakmeegolla is a village located in Kurunegala District of Sri Lanka, 10 km (6.2 mi) from Kurunegala, the capital city of the North Western Province.

== Maps ==
- Detailed map of Bakmeegolla vicinity and Sri Lanka
