= Vanathavilluwa Divisional Secretariat =

- Divisional Secretariat
- Location within Sri Lanka
- Country: Sri Lanka
- Province: North Western Province
- District: Puttalam District
- Time zone: UTC+5:30 (Sri Lanka Standard Time)

Vanathavilluwa Divisional Secretariat is a Divisional Secretariat of Puttalam District, of North Western Province, Sri Lanka.

== Demography-Religion ==
Religion in Vanathavilluwa DS Division (2012)
1. Buddhist (39.1%)
2. Hindu (4.20%)
3. Muslim (37.3%)
4. Roman Catholic (17.3%)
5. Other Christian (2.10%)
6. Other (0.00%)
