= Karaitivu (Puttalam) =

Karaitivu கரைத்தீவு
- Village
- Location within Sri Lanka
- Coordinates: 08°20′N 79°44′E
- Country: Sri Lanka
- Province: North Western
- District: Puttalam
- DS Division: Karaitivu

Karaitivu (Tamil: கரைத்தீவு) is a coastal village situated in the Calpentyn peninsula of the Puttalam District and is located 29 km away from Puttalam, the district headquarters.
