= Liyanagemulla =

Sri Lankan village

Coordinates: 07°09′00″N 79°53′00″E

Liyanagemulla (Sinhalese: ලියනගෙමුල්ල Tamil: லியனகேமுல்ல) is a village situated in Gampaha District, Western Province, Sri Lanka lying near the west coast to the south of the city of Negombo and is administered by the katunayake seeduwa urban council. It is located 30 km from Colombo, and 12 km from Negombo. It is on the Katunayake-Colombo road (A03) and is located a few miles from the Bandaranaike International Airport and Katunayake Export Processing Zone.

== Transport ==
Rail

Liyanagemulla railway station

- The village is served by a station on the north coast line of the national railway network. The Liyanagemulla Railway Station is on the Colombo-Puttalam Railway Line, and is the 17th railway station from Colombo.

Road

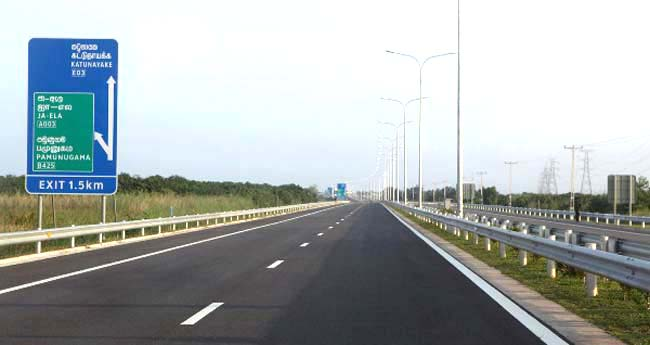
Colombo Katunayake Expressway declared open

- Colombo – Katunayake Expressway opened in 2013 links the capital Colombo through the Katunayake Interchange.
- The A3 main road from Colombo, goes through Negombo, extends to Jaffna, and Trincomalee via Anuradhapura.

== Geography ==
- Liyanagemulla is located at 7°08'45.8"N 79°52'25.0"E (7.146043, 79.873615).
- The village has a total area: 980,231.05 m^{2} (10,551,119.19 ft^{2}) Total distance: 4.01 km (2.49 mi).

== Place names near Liyanagemulla ==
- Katunayake
- Seeduwa
- Mukalangamuwa
- Amandoluwa
- Jayawardanapura
- Awariwatta
- Lion City

== Education ==
- St. Thomas' Catholic International College
- Sailan International School

== Religion ==
Catholic & Christian Churches

- St. Anthony's Church (කැලෑ පල්ලිය)

Buddhist Temple

- Liyanagemulla Temple

Buddhist Temple

- Suvisuddarama Temple

== See also ==
- Seeduwa
- Kurana
- Kandawala
