= Kalpitiya Divisional Secretariat =

- Divisional Secretariat
- Interactive map of Kalpitiya Divisional Secretariat
- Country: Sri Lanka
- Province: North Western Province
- District: Puttalam District
- Time zone: UTC+5:30 (Sri Lanka Standard Time)

Kalpitiya Divisional Secretariat is a Divisional Secretariat of Puttalam District, of North Western Province, Sri Lanka.

== Demography-Religion ==
Religion in Kalpitiya DS Division (2012)
1. Buddhist (6.40%)
2. Hindu (4.60%)
3. Muslim (54.6%)
4. Roman Catholic (32.3%)
5. Other Christian (0.90%)
6. Other (1.20%)
