= Mahakumbukkadawala Divisional Secretariat =

- Divisional Secretariat
- Interactive map of Mahakumbukkadawala Divisional Secretariat
- Country: Sri Lanka
- Province: North Western Province
- District: Puttalam District
- Time zone: UTC+5:30 (Sri Lanka Standard Time)

Mahakumbukkadawala Divisional Secretariat is a Divisional Secretariat of Puttalam District, of North Western Province, Sri Lanka.

== Demography-Religion ==
Religion in Mahakumbukkadawala DS Division (2012)
1. Buddhist (85.1%)
2. Hindu (2.00%)
3. Muslim (0.10%)
4. Roman Catholic (12.1%)
5. Other Christian (0.80%)
6. Other (0.00%)
