= Seeduwa =

Seeduwa: සීදුව; சீதுவை
- Suburb
- Location in Sri Lanka
- Coordinates: 7°7′53″N 79°52′35″E
- Country: Sri Lanka
- Province: Western Province
- District: Gampaha
- Divisional Secretariat: Katana

Government
  - Type: Urban Council
  - Chairman: Sarath Peiris (UNP)

Area
  - Total: 12.065 km^{2} (4.658 sq mi)
- Elevation (at Seeduwa Railway Station): 4.87 m (16.0 ft)

Population (2011)
  - Total: 38,355
  - Density: 3,179.03/km^{2} (8,233.6/sq mi)
- Time zone: Sri Lanka Standard Time Zone +5.30
- ZIP code: 11410
- Area code: 011

Seeduwa (/sīðuvə/; Sinhalese: සීදුව Seeduwa pronounced [sīðuvə]; Tamil: சீதுவை Seeduwai pronounced [Cītuvai]) is a suburb of Negombo, in Katana Divisional Secretariat, Western Province of Sri Lanka. It is located on the A03 road between Colombo and Negombo.

Seeduwa is 20.6 km (12.8 mi) north of Colombo via E003, and 18.7 km (11.6 mi) north via A03, and is situated south of Katunayake, north of Ja-Ela, and west of Raddoluwa and east of Negombo Lagoon. Seeduwa has an area of 12.065 km^{2} (4.658 sq mi). In 2012, Seeduwa had a population of 38,355 with the majority of people either Roman Catholics, Methodists or Buddhists.

== Etymology ==
There are four theories about the origin of the name "Seeduwa":

Duwa දූව pronounced [ðūvə]) meaning "island" is given to the village as it is surrounded by the river Dandugam Oya (Attanugalu Oya), as well as canals and paddy fields, giving Seeduwa an island-like appearance. The four theories concern the beginning portion "සී" (See-) of the name Seeduwa.

1. The name could have derived from Sinha Duwa ("සිංහදූව") pronounced [siṁhə ðūvə] derived from සිංහයන් සිටි = සිංහදූව සීදුව [=island where lions existed] ) due to the belief of past presence of lions in the village. However, there is no evidence of lions existed in Sri Lanka after 37,000 BC, which makes this theory neglectable.
2. The name could have derived from Sinha Duwa ("සිංහදූව") pronounced [siṁhə ðūvə] derived from සිංහගේ දූව = සිංහදූව සීදුව [=Sinha's Island] ) because King Bhuwanaikabahu V gave this area to a chief named Sinha.
3. The name could have derived from Sivu Dupath ("සිවුදූපත්") pronounced [sivu ðūpaθ] derived from දූපත් සතර = සිවුදූපත්සී දුව [= four islands] ) because there are four areas in Seeduwa (Athul Owita, Maddegoda, Vena and Maharagodalla) which are separated with small canals and paddy fields, creating the appearance of four islands.
4. Finally, that it could have derived from Siri Duwa ("සිරිදූව")pronounced [siri ðūvə] derived from සිරිමත් දූව = සිරි දූව සීදුව [= prosperous island] ) because in the past this was a prosperous area.

== History ==
The first historical evidence of Seeduwa occurs in the era of King Bhuwanekabahu V, when this area was given to a chief named Simha.

As Seeduwa is a village in the coastal area, which has been governed by the Portuguese, Dutch and English during their respective periods of control of the island, thus their influence is significant. Evidence from the Dutch period includes the observation tower at Amandoluwa. In 1890, a Roman Catholic church building was built in Seeduwa, for a congregation which had previously met in a small tent.

With the development occurred after establishment of open economy, this area became very significant as a result of the location in between the Investment Promotion Zone in Katunayake, and Ekala Industrial Estate. Most of the employees started to board in Seeduwa. As a result, Seeduwa got more populated.

== Geography ==
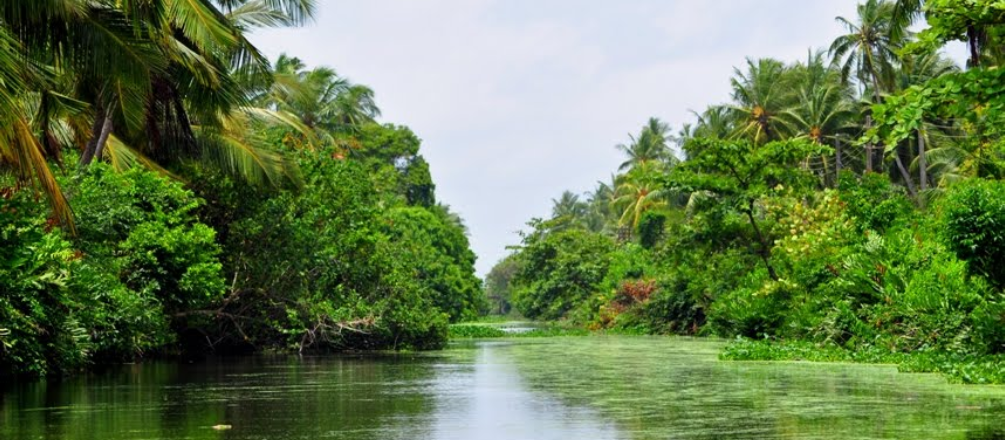
Dandugam Oya, which runs through the border of Seeduwa

Seeduwa is bordered from the Dandugam Oya (Aththanugalu Oya) to the South and East, while from the Negombo Lagoon to the West. It is majorly composed of land, marshes and the mangroves. Dandugam Oya (Aththanagalu Oya), and Dickwela stream, which is a natural stream starting from the river exist as the water bodies running through the village. Marshy fields are found surrounding the canal and the river. Mangrove ecosystems are found in the estuary of Dandugam Oya (Aththanagalu Oya), and along the lining of the lagoon. Most of the water is taken from ground, as per availability of ground water.

=== Climate ===
Seeduwa has a tropical monsoon climate. Temperature of Seeduwa is fairly temperate throughout the year. May and October are the months with maximum precipitation. The yearly average temperature is 29.5 °C (85.1 °F).

Climate data for Seeduwa, Sri Lanka
Month	Jan	Feb	Mar	Apr	May	Jun	Jul	Aug	Sep	Oct	Nov	Dec	Year
Mean daily maximum °C (°F)	31 (88)	31 (88)	31 (88)	31 (88)	31 (88)	30 (86)	30 (86)	30 (86)	30 (86)	30 (86)	30 (86)	30 (86)	33 (91)
Daily mean °C (°F)	26.5 (79.7)	26.5 (79.7)	27 (81)	27.5 (81.5)	28 (82)	27.5 (81.5)	27.5 (81.5)	27.5 (81.5)	27 (81)	27 (81)	26.5 (79.7)	26 (79)	29.5 (85.1)
Mean daily minimum °C (°F)	22 (72)	22 (72)	23 (73)	24 (75)	25 (77)	25 (77)	25 (77)	25 (77)	24 (75)	24 (75)	23 (73)	22 (72)	26 (79)
Average precipitation mm (inches)	62 (2.4)	69 (2.7)	130 (5.1)	253 (10.0)	382 (15.0)	186 (7.3)	125 (4.9)	114 (4.5)	236 (9.3)	369 (14.5)	310 (12.2)	168 (6.6)	2,404 (94.5)
Average precipitation days	8	7	11	18	23	22	15	15	17	21	19	12	188
Average relative humidity (%) (at Daytime)	70	69	69	72	77	79	78	77	76	77	76	72	76
Mean monthly sunshine hours	248	246	276	234	202	195	202	202	189	202	210	217	2,623
Source 1: World Weather and Climate Information
Source 2: World Weather Online (yearly)

== Government ==
Before 1970, Seeduwa was governed by the Andiambalama Village Council. From 1970 onwards Seeduwa has been governed by the Seeduwa Katunayake Urban Council. Its chairman is elected every five years through local government polls. Following the 2018 local government elections the Sri Lanka Podujana Peramuna hold the majority of the Council seats. Sarath Peiris, a United National Party politician, however was elected as chairman.

=== Zones ===
Seeduwa consists of 6 zones which includes 9 wards of Katunayake Seeduwa Urban Council.

- Seeduwa (/sīðuvə/)
  - Seeduwa North
  - Seeduwa South
- Amandoluwa (/amanðoluvə/)
- Bandarawaththe (/baṇḍāravaððə/)
  - Bandarawaththe West
  - Bandarawaththe East
- Ambalammulla (/ambəlammullə/)
- Mookalangamuwa (/mūkəlaṁgəmuvə/)
  - Mookalangamuwa West
  - Mookalangamuwa East
- Liyanagemulla (/liyənəgēmullə/)
  - Liyanagemulla North
  - Liyanagemulla South

== Economy ==
In the 19th century, the economy of Seeduwa was based on coconut and cinnamon production, as well as carpentry, in which the residents were employed in.

After the economical changes happened in Sri Lanka in 1977, a noticeable change of economy happened in this area. Therefore, this area was chosen to the establishment of Investment Promotion Zone, Bandaranayake International Airport (CMB), army camps, State Distilleries Corporation (Currently DCSL) were established in this area. With the establishments of industries under Investment Board, this became a town of national importance.

Ambalammulla area, which is the southernmost, is still famous for its pottery.

== Religions ==
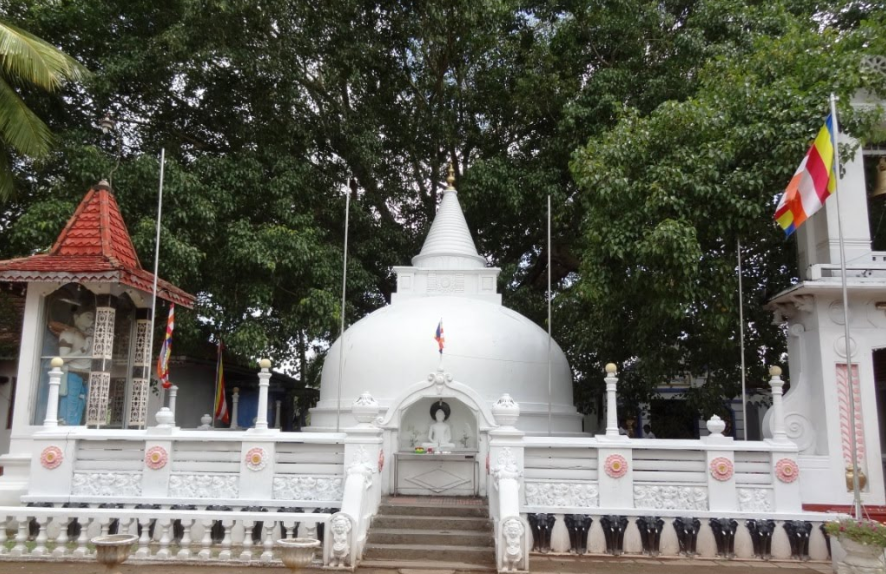
Gangarama Temple at Seeduwa

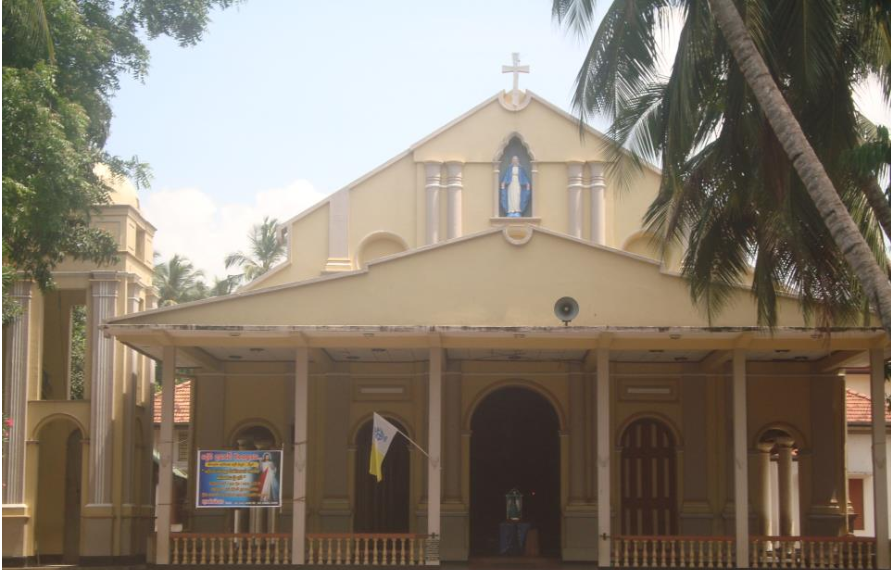
Church of Immaculata Virgin Mary - Seeduwa

Before the 17th century, most inhabitants of Seeduwa was Buddhists. An old Sanhida is located under the Banyan tree near the ferry.

In the 17th century, Roman Catholic priests came to the village and many were converted. In 1890, a church was built and dedicated to Immaculata Virgin Mary, replacing a tent the congregation had met in previously.

In 1814, Methodist ministers arrived and established a church, converted a number of people.

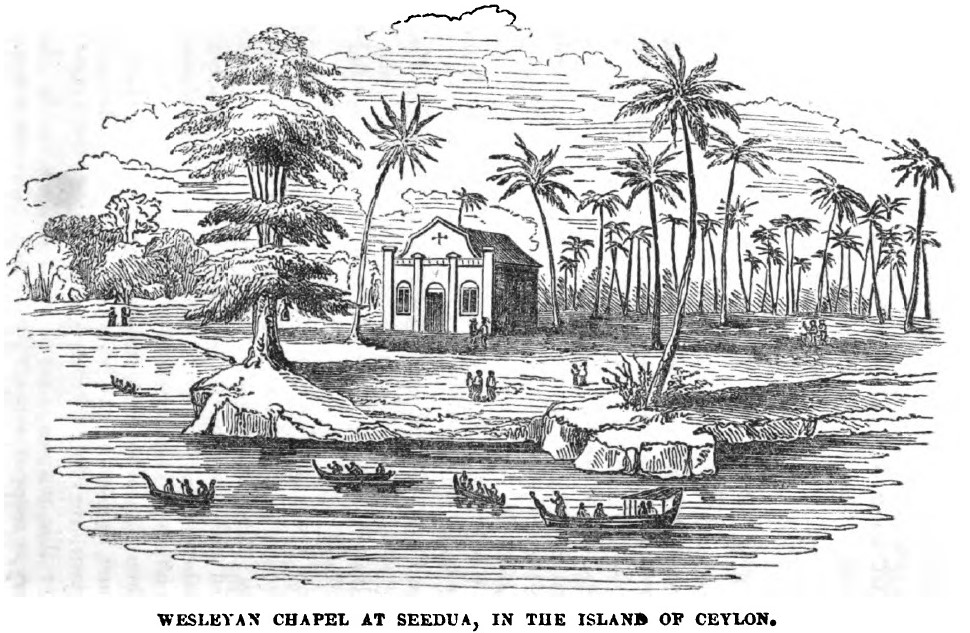
Wesleyan Chapel at Seeduwa, in the Island of Ceylon (1846)

During the early 20th century, relations between Catholics and Methodists were strained. In 1946, Methodist leader Rev. Dencil De Silva, who led the Methodist council, opened a youth centre to people of any religion, easing some of the religious tension in the region. Now all live in peace and harmony.

Present day, the majority is Roman Catholic Population, alongside Buddhists, Methodists, and other Christians.

=== Places of Religious Importance ===
==== Buddhist ====
- Sri Sugatharama Temple - Mookalangamuwa
- Suvisuddharama Temple - Liyanagemulla
- Shantharamaya Temple - Mookalangamuwa
- Gangaramaya Temple - Ambalammulla
- Bandarawaththe Bodhiya - Badarawaththe
- Mahawaththe Bodhiya - Mookalangamuwa

==== Roman Catholic ====
===== Seeduwa Parish =====
- Church of Immaculata Virgin Mary - Seeduwa
- Church of St. Francis Salis - Amandoluwa
- Church of St. Sebastian - Jayawardanapura
- Church of St. Jude - Kurulukele
- Supuwath Arana - Seeduwa

===== Bandarawaththe Parish =====
- Church of St. Mary - Bandarawaththe

===== Liyanagemulla Parish =====
- Shrine of St. Anthony - Liyanagemulla

==== Methodist ====
- Seeduwa Methodist Church
- Rajapakshapura Methodist Church
- Liyanagemulla Methodist Church
- Maddegoda Methodist Church
- Jayawardanapura Methodist Church

== Transportation ==
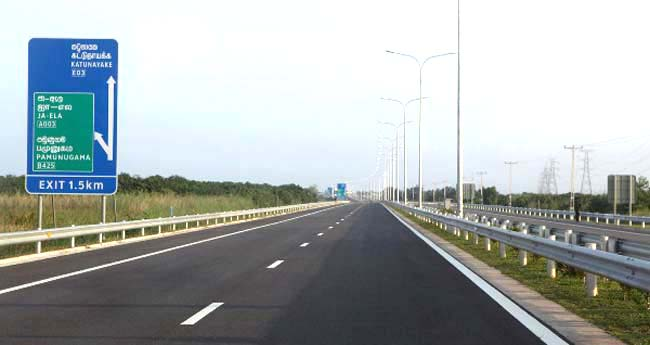
E03 near Seeduwa

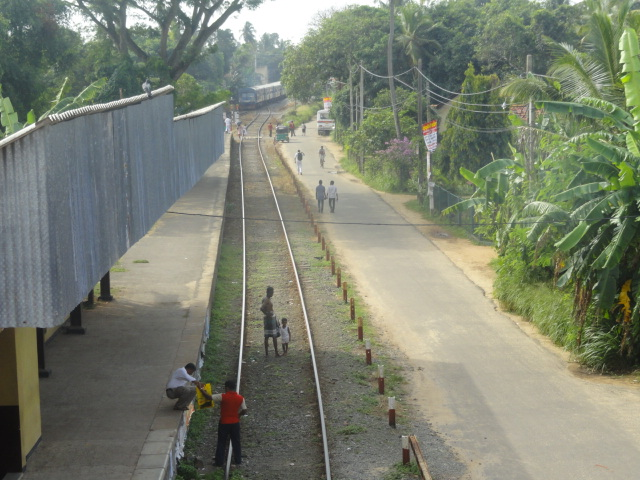
Seeduwa Railway Station

=== Road Transport ===
Seeduwa is located on the A3 (Colombo - Negombo Road). The newly constructed E03 (Colombo Katunayake Expressway) runs through the boundaries of Seeduwa.

==== Bus ====
Most of the bus routes which start from Colombo or Ja-Ela and passing or destined to Negombo run through the border of Seeduwa. Other than that some busses run from Raddolugama to Seeduwa and to Awariwaththe (Katunayake).

=== Rail Transport ===
The Puttlam railway line runs through Seeduwa. Seeduwa railway station is a railway station where most of the express trains stop. Puttlam line ends its double track from Seeduwa to begin a single track. Currently double track is under construction from Seeduwa. Railway stations in Seeduwa are:

- Seeduwa Railway Station
- Liyanagemulla Railway Station

=== Other Transport ===
Other than Bandaranayake International Airport, the main seaplane landing port in Sri Lanka has been opened on the shore of Dandugam (Aththanagalu) Oya at Seeduwa, which will be run by SriLankan Airlines.

== Education ==
Schools in Seeduwa are under the Negombo Educational Zone. Following is a list of several of the schools in the area.

- Amandoluwa RCPV
- Amandoluwa MV
- Bandaranayake JSV
- Davisamara MV
- Seeduwa Methodist PV
- Seeduwa RCPV
- Sri Jothirathna V
- St. Mary's PV

== Sports ==
Seeduwa has the traditional history of producing prominent volleyball players and even schools like Davisamara College, and Seeduwa. Some recent players are as follows:

Members of Sri Lanka Junior Men's Volleyball team 2017 for 18th Asian Junior Men's (under 21) Volleyball Championships who are from Seeduwa:

- Rehan Madusanka Fernando (Davisamara MV)
- Mihiranga Udayakumara (Davisamara MV)
- Vishmana Chankama (Davisamara MV)
- Chamika Sandaruwan (Davisamara MV)

Members of Asian Youth Volleyball squad for Myanmar tourney 2017 who are from Seeduwa:

- Dinidu Ruchintha Lakshan Tissera (Davisamara MV)
- Pasindu Sandaruwan (Davisamara MV)
- Dilanka Maduranga (Davisamara MV)

Cricket and Elle are also popular in Seeduwa.

== Notable residents ==
=== Actors ===
- Vijaya Kumaranathunga - actor, politician
- Jeewan Kumarathunga - actor, politician

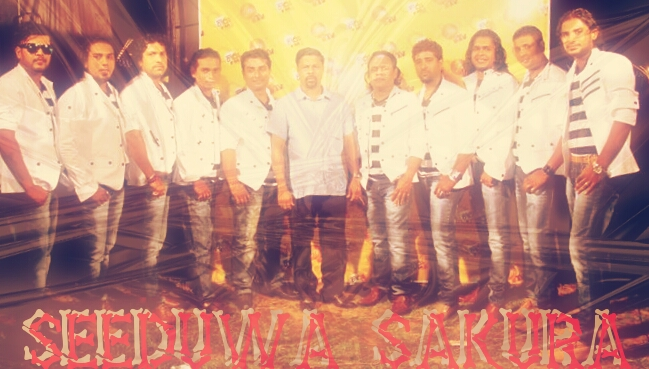
Seeduwa Sakura, a band originated from Seeduwa

=== Musicians ===
- Henry Caldera - singer, songwriter, musician
- Ivo Denis - singer

=== Musical Bands Originated ===
- Seeduwa Sakura
- Seeduwa Bravo

== See also ==
- E03 expressway (Sri Lanka)
- Liyanagemulla
