= Marawila =

Marawila මාරවිල
- Town
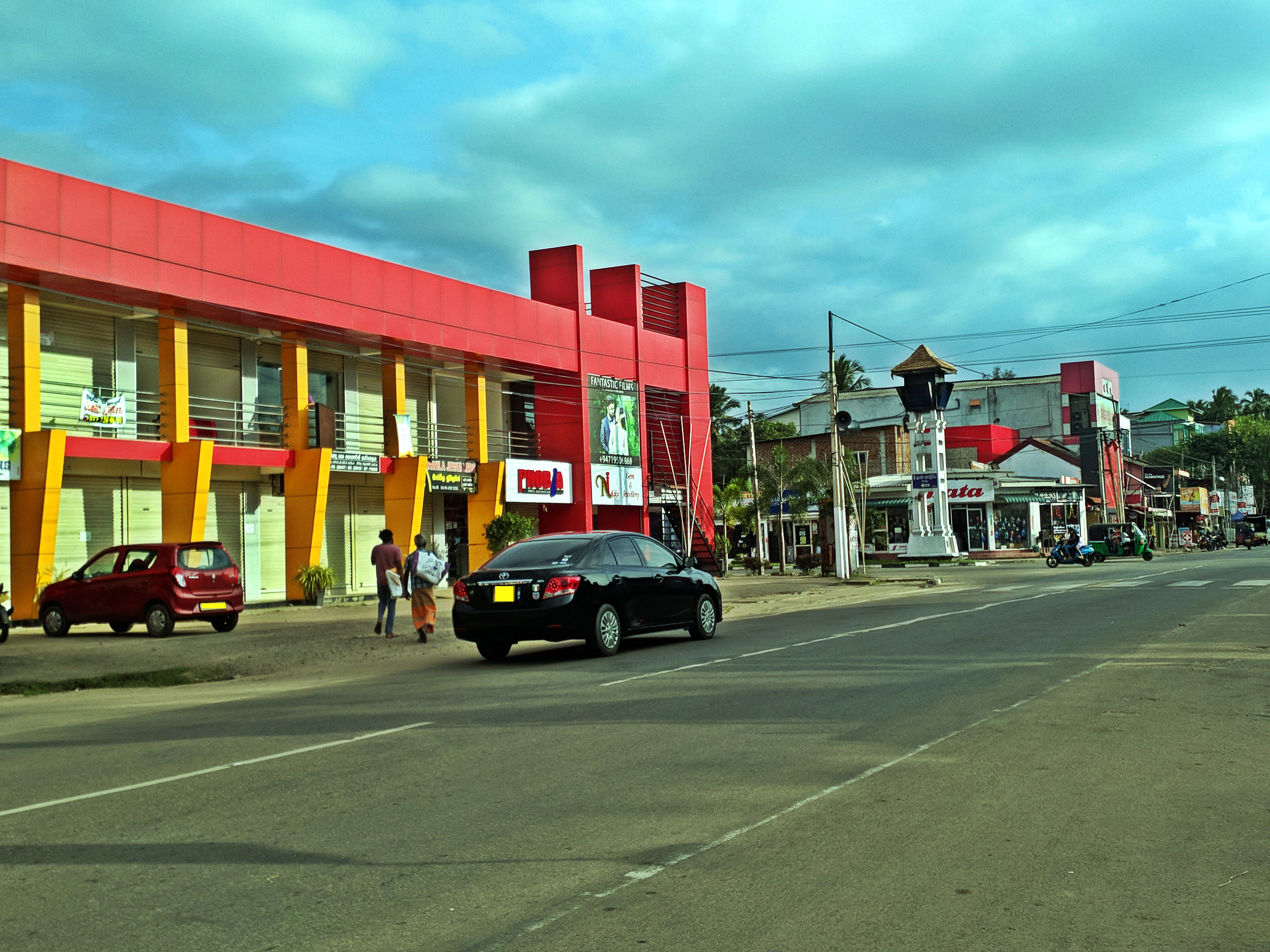
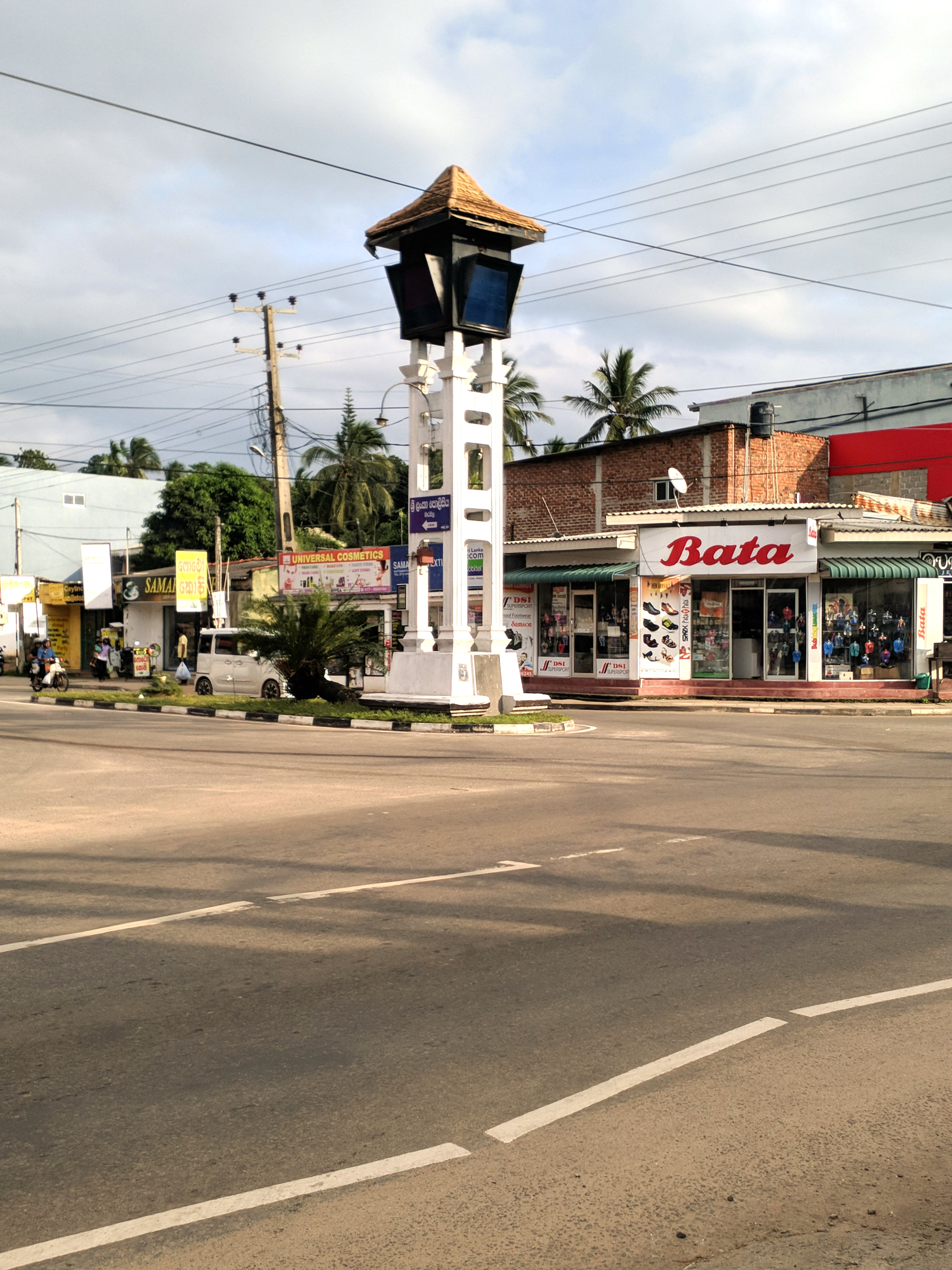
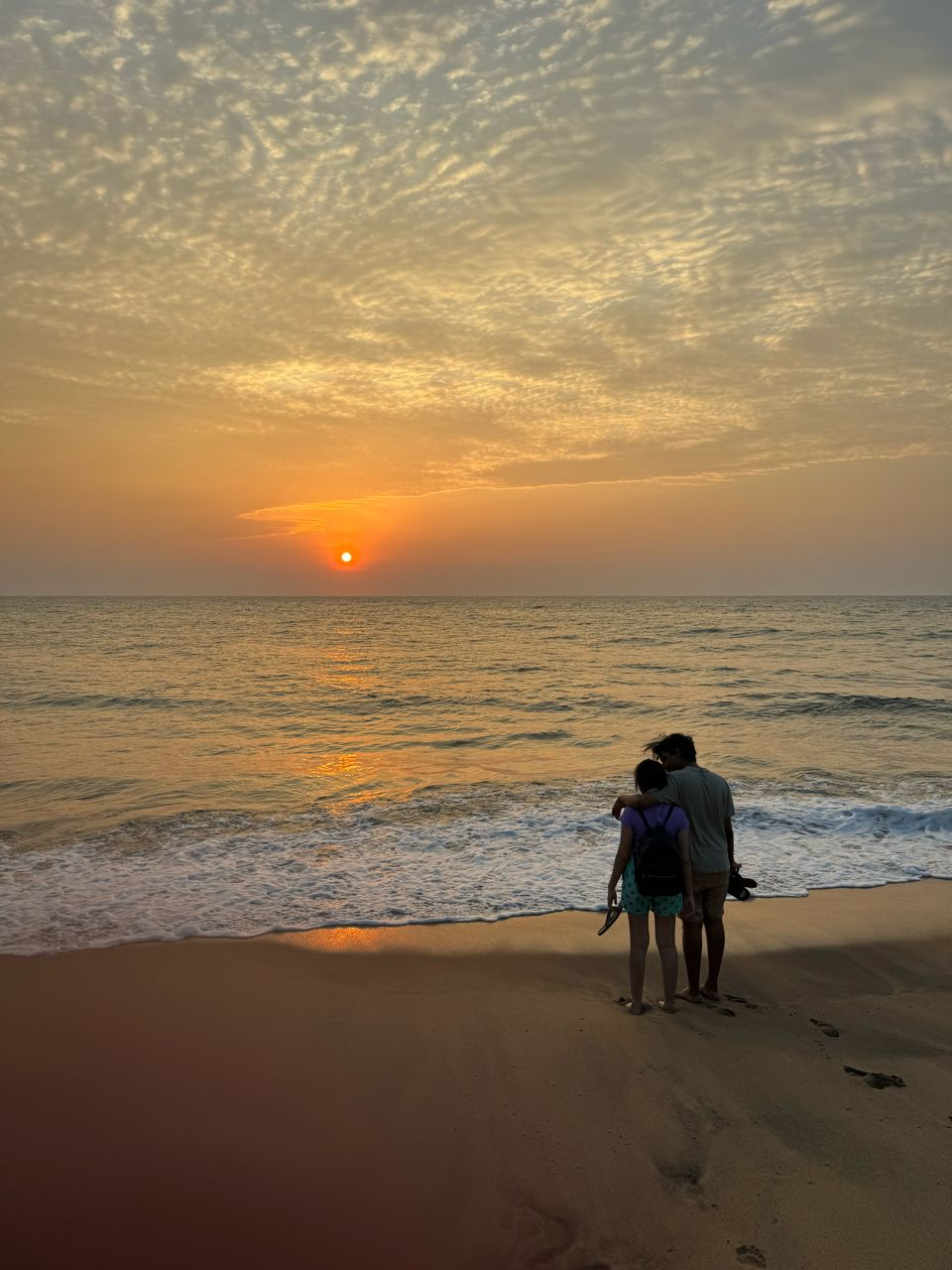
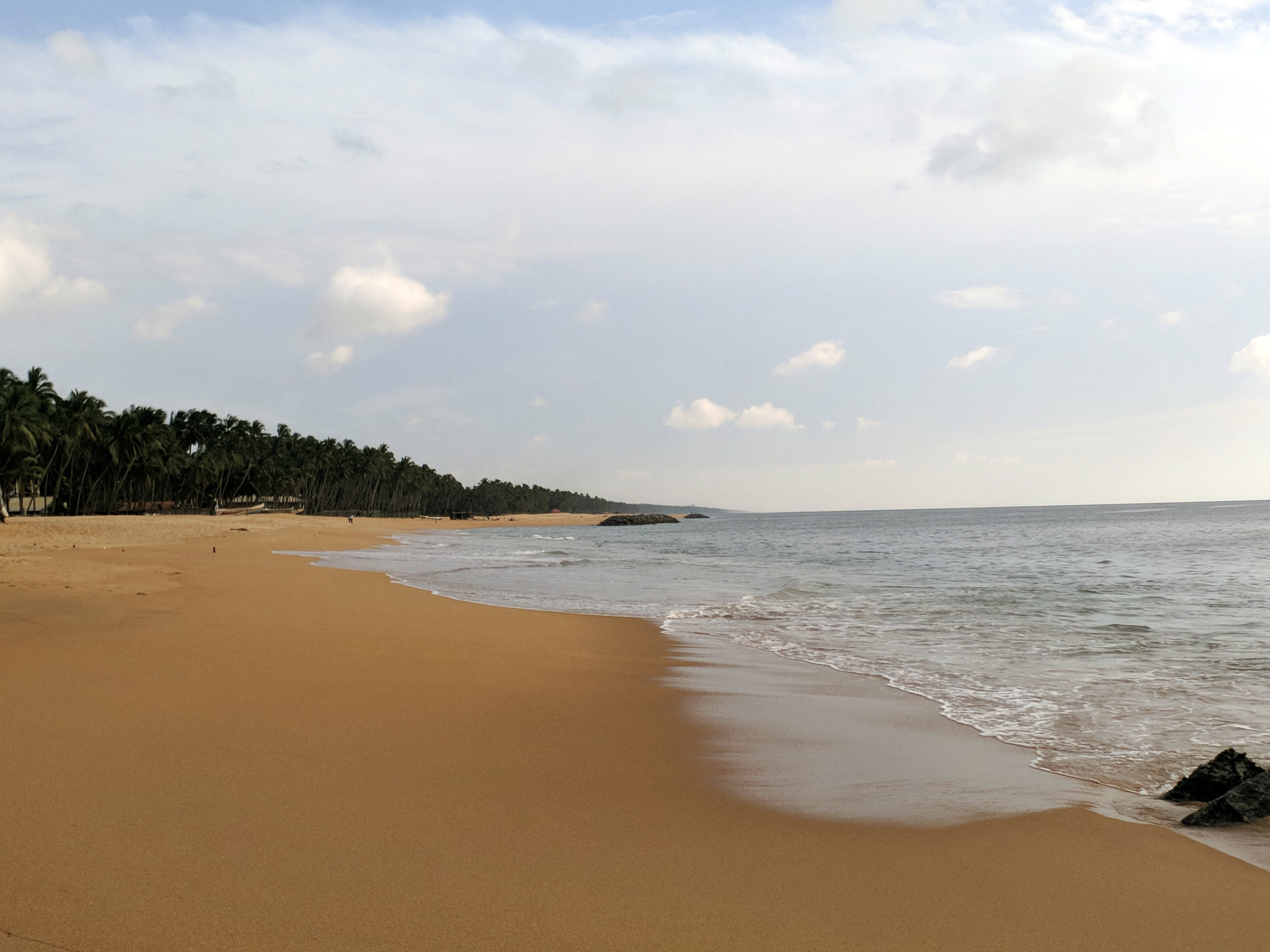
- Clockwise from top: Marawila Town, Marawila Clock Tower, Marawila Beach, Marawila Beach

- Location in Sri Lanka
- Coordinates: 7°24′34″N 79°49′56″E
- Country: Sri Lanka
- Province: North Western Province
- District: Puttalam District
- Time zone: +5.30
- Postal code: 61210

Marawila (Sinhala: මාරවිල) is a town in Puttalam District, North Western Province, Sri Lanka.

It is located on the A3 highway, which connects Negombo and Chilaw. The town is located 27 km (17 mi) away from Negombo. Marawila is one of the tourist attractions on the west coast of Sri Lanka and known for its beaches.

== Infrastructure ==
=== Education ===
- St. Xavier's College, Marawila
- Holy Family Girls School, Marawila
- St. Mary's Boys School

=== Hospitals ===
A Type B Government Base Hospital situated in Marawila.
