= Anamaduwa Divisional Secretariat =

- Divisional Secretariat
- Interactive map of Anamaduwa Divisional Secretariat
- Coordinates: 7°54′02″N 79°59′47″E
- Country: Sri Lanka
- Province: North Western Province
- District: Puttalam District
- Time zone: UTC+5:30 (Sri Lanka Standard Time)

Anamaduwa Divisional Secretariat is a Divisional Secretariat of Puttalam District, of North Western Province, Sri Lanka.

== Demography-Religion ==
Religion in Anamaduwa DS Division (2012)
1. Buddhist (93.9%)
2. Hindu (0.20%)
3. Muslim (1.90%)
4. Roman Catholic (3.40%)
5. Other Christian (0.60%)
6. Other (0.00%)
