= Kumarakattuwa =

- Location in Sri Lanka
- Coordinates: 7°39′0″N 79°54′7″E
- Country: Sri Lanka
- Province: North Western

Kumarakattuwa is a town that is situated in North Western, Sri Lanka. It is almost 20km from a main city.
