= Chilaw Polling Division =

Chilaw
- Polling Division
- Interactive map of Chilaw
- Coordinates: 7.738379°N 79.844546°E
- Country: Sri Lanka
- Province: North Western Province, Sri Lanka
- Electoral District: Puttalam Electoral District

Area
  - Total: 838.31 km^{2} (323.67 sq mi)

Population (2012)
  - Total: 231,705
  - Density: 276/km^{2} (710/sq mi)
- ISO 3166 code: EC-16C

The Chilaw Polling Division is a Polling Division in the Puttalam Electoral District, in the North Western Province, Sri Lanka.

== Presidential Election Results ==
=== Summary ===
The winner of Chilaw has matched the final country result 6 out of 8 times.

Year	Chilaw	Puttalam Electoral District	MAE %	Sri Lanka	MAE %
2019	SLPP	SLPP	3.65%	SLPP	2.07%
2015	UPFA	NDF	1.52%	NDF	2.82%
2010	UPFA	UPFA	0.94%	UPFA	1.64%
2005	UNP	UNP	0.44%	UPFA	1.75%
1999	PA	PA	0.63%	PA	0.91%
1994	PA	PA	2.02%	PA	1.81%
1988	UNP	UNP	2.48%	UNP	1.75%
1982	UNP	UNP	1.45%	UNP	5.69%
Matches/Mean MAE	6/8	7/8	1.64%	8/8	2.30%

=== 2019 Sri Lankan Presidential Election ===
Party	Chilaw		Puttalam Electoral District		Sri Lanka	
Party	Votes	%	Votes	%	Votes	%
SLPP	51,233	54.57%	230,760	50.83%	6,924,255	52.25%
NDF	37,512	39.96%	199,356	43.91%	5,564,239	41.99%
NMPP	2,977	3.17%	12,912	2.84%	418,553	3.16%
Other Parties (with < 1%)	2,163	2.30%	10,948	2.41%	345,452	2.61%
Valid Votes	93,885	98.96%	453,976	99.02%	13,252,499	98.99%
Rejected Votes	984	1.04%	4,478	0.98%	135,452	1.01%
Total Polled	94,869	77.15%	458,454	76.53%	13,387,951	83.71%
Registered Electors	122,963		599,042		15,992,568	

=== 2015 Sri Lankan Presidential Election ===
Party	Chilaw		Puttalam Electoral District		Sri Lanka	
Party	Votes	%	Votes	%	Votes	%
UPFA	43,928	50.50%	197,751	48.97%	5,768,090	47.58%
NDF	42,187	48.50%	202,073	50.04%	6,217,162	51.28%
Other Parties (with < 1%)	870	1.00%	4,026	1.00%	138,200	1.14%
Valid Votes	86,985	98.88%	403,850	98.95%	12,123,452	98.85%
Rejected Votes	985	1.12%	4,300	1.05%	140,925	1.15%
Total Polled	87,970	74.44%	408,150	72.50%	12,264,377	78.69%
Registered Electors	118,171		562,984		15,585,942	

=== 2010 Sri Lankan Presidential Election ===
Party	Chilaw		Puttalam Electoral District		Sri Lanka	
Party	Votes	%	Votes	%	Votes	%
UPFA	45,617	59.65%	201,981	58.70%	6,015,934	57.88%
NDF	29,541	38.63%	136,233	39.59%	4,173,185	40.15%
Other Parties (with < 1%)	1,312	1.72%	5,899	1.71%	204,494	1.97%
Valid Votes	76,470	99.28%	344,113	99.17%	10,393,613	99.03%
Rejected Votes	558	0.72%	2,886	0.83%	101,838	0.97%
Total Polled	77,028	71.16%	346,999	68.97%	10,495,451	66.70%
Registered Electors	108,244		503,106		15,734,587	

=== 2005 Sri Lankan Presidential Election ===
Party	Chilaw		Puttalam Electoral District		Sri Lanka	
Party	Votes	%	Votes	%	Votes	%
UNP	37,372	50.25%	169,264	50.71%	4,706,366	48.43%
UPFA	36,115	48.56%	160,686	48.14%	4,887,152	50.29%
Other Parties (with < 1%)	891	1.20%	3,833	1.15%	123,521	1.27%
Valid Votes	74,378	99.09%	333,783	98.95%	9,717,039	98.88%
Rejected Votes	685	0.91%	3,536	1.05%	109,869	1.12%
Total Polled	75,063	72.89%	337,319	70.56%	9,826,908	69.51%
Registered Electors	102,987		478,032		14,136,979	

=== 1999 Sri Lankan Presidential Election ===
Party	Chilaw		Puttalam Electoral District		Sri Lanka	
Party	Votes	%	Votes	%	Votes	%
PA	31,998	52.13%	141,725	51.47%	4,312,157	51.12%
UNP	26,708	43.51%	121,615	44.17%	3,602,748	42.71%
JVP	1,813	2.95%	7,876	2.86%	343,927	4.08%
Other Parties (with < 1%)	864	1.41%	4,123	1.50%	176,679	2.09%
Valid Votes	61,383	97.91%	275,339	97.94%	8,435,754	97.69%
Rejected Votes	1,309	2.09%	5,778	2.06%	199,536	2.31%
Total Polled	62,692	71.33%	281,117	68.85%	8,635,290	72.17%
Registered Electors	87,891		408,331		11,965,536	

=== 1994 Sri Lankan Presidential Election ===
Party	Chilaw		Puttalam Electoral District		Sri Lanka	
Party	Votes	%	Votes	%	Votes	%
PA	35,415	60.62%	165,795	62.65%	4,709,205	62.28%
UNP	22,240	38.07%	95,211	35.98%	2,715,283	35.91%
Other Parties (with < 1%)	766	1.31%	3,629	1.37%	137,040	1.81%
Valid Votes	58,421	98.42%	264,635	98.26%	7,561,526	98.03%
Rejected Votes	936	1.58%	4,689	1.74%	151,706	1.97%
Total Polled	59,357	71.47%	269,324	69.80%	7,713,232	69.12%
Registered Electors	83,057		385,854		11,158,880	

=== 1988 Sri Lankan Presidential Election ===
Party	Chilaw		Puttalam Electoral District		Sri Lanka	
Party	Votes	%	Votes	%	Votes	%
UNP	27,932	53.55%	125,339	55.89%	2,569,199	50.43%
SLFP	23,485	45.02%	94,823	42.28%	2,289,857	44.95%
SLMP	748	1.43%	4,093	1.83%	235,701	4.63%
Valid Votes	52,165	98.62%	224,255	98.70%	5,094,754	98.24%
Rejected Votes	731	1.38%	2,965	1.30%	91,499	1.76%
Total Polled	52,896	74.95%	227,220	70.70%	5,186,256	55.87%
Registered Electors	70,574		321,387		9,283,143	

=== 1982 Sri Lankan Presidential Election ===
Party	Chilaw		Puttalam Electoral District		Sri Lanka	
Party	Votes	%	Votes	%	Votes	%
UNP	30,142	60.75%	128,877	59.12%	3,450,815	52.93%
SLFP	17,553	35.38%	80,006	36.70%	2,546,348	39.05%
JVP	1,525	3.07%	7,001	3.21%	273,428	4.19%
Other Parties (with < 1%)	397	0.80%	2,096	0.96%	249,460	3.83%
Valid Votes	49,617	99.04%	217,980	99.09%	6,520,156	98.78%
Rejected Votes	479	0.96%	1,995	0.91%	80,470	1.22%
Total Polled	50,096	81.95%	219,975	81.41%	6,600,626	80.15%
Registered Electors	61,128		270,207		8,235,358	

== Parliamentary Election Results ==
=== Summary ===
The winner of Chilaw has matched the final country result 7 out of 7 times. Hence, Chilaw is a Bellwether for Parliamentary Elections.

Year	Chilaw	Puttalam Electoral District	MAE %	Sri Lanka	MAE %
2015	UNP	UNP	1.40%	UNP	3.26%
2010	UPFA	UPFA	1.11%	UPFA	3.92%
2004	UPFA	UPFA	0.38%	UPFA	5.01%
2001	UNP	UNP	0.98%	UNP	4.20%
2000	PA	PA	1.76%	PA	3.15%
1994	PA	PA	1.70%	PA	2.84%
1989	UNP	UNP	1.67%	UNP	6.65%
Matches/Mean MAE	7/7	7/7	1.28%	7/7	4.15%

=== 2015 Sri Lankan Parliamentary Election ===
Party	Chilaw		Puttalam Electoral District		Sri Lanka	
Party	Votes	%	Votes	%	Votes	%
UNP	38,482	50.21%	180,185	51.81%	5,098,916	45.77%
UPFA	34,701	45.27%	153,130	44.03%	4,732,664	42.48%
JVP	3,077	4.01%	12,211	3.51%	544,154	4.88%
Other Parties (with < 1%)	387	0.50%	2,263	0.65%	82,383	0.74%
Valid Votes	76,647	94.12%	347,789	91.37%	11,140,333	95.35%
Rejected Votes	4,710	5.78%	23,124	6.08%	516,926	4.42%
Total Polled	81,433	68.91%	380,632	68.83%	11,684,111	77.66%
Registered Electors	118,171		553,009		15,044,490	

=== 2010 Sri Lankan Parliamentary Election ===
Party	Chilaw		Puttalam Electoral District		Sri Lanka	
Party	Votes	%	Votes	%	Votes	%
UPFA	38,073	66.11%	167,769	64.84%	4,846,388	60.38%
UNP	17,555	30.48%	81,152	31.36%	2,357,057	29.37%
DNA	1,759	3.05%	8,792	3.40%	441,251	5.50%
Other Parties (with < 1%)	203	0.35%	1,028	0.40%	33,372	0.42%
Valid Votes	57,590	93.06%	258,741	92.29%	8,026,322	96.03%
Rejected Votes	4,288	6.93%	21,562	7.69%	581,465	6.96%
Total Polled	61,884	57.17%	280,354	55.67%	8,358,246	59.29%
Registered Electors	108,244		503,635		14,097,690	

=== 2004 Sri Lankan Parliamentary Election ===
Party	Chilaw		Puttalam Electoral District		Sri Lanka	
Party	Votes	%	Votes	%	Votes	%
UPFA	31,124	48.77%	142,784	49.31%	4,223,126	45.70%
UNP	29,934	46.91%	135,152	46.67%	3,486,792	37.73%
JHU	2,352	3.69%	10,000	3.45%	552,723	5.98%
Other Parties (with < 1%)	404	0.63%	1,652	0.57%	62,157	0.67%
Valid Votes	63,814	93.82%	289,588	93.06%	9,241,931	94.52%
Rejected Votes	4,169	6.13%	21,431	6.89%	534,452	5.47%
Total Polled	68,018	69.13%	311,194	69.15%	9,777,821	75.74%
Registered Electors	98,394		450,057		12,909,631	

=== 2001 Sri Lankan Parliamentary Election ===
Party	Chilaw		Puttalam Electoral District		Sri Lanka	
Party	Votes	%	Votes	%	Votes	%
UNP	32,254	49.63%	146,873	50.61%	4,086,026	45.62%
PA	27,821	42.81%	120,981	41.69%	3,330,815	37.19%
JVP	3,888	5.98%	18,095	6.24%	815,353	9.10%
Other Parties (with < 1%)	1,023	1.57%	4,260	1.47%	116,969	1.31%
Valid Votes	64,986	95.39%	290,209	95.20%	8,955,844	94.77%
Rejected Votes	3,142	4.61%	14,638	4.80%	494,009	5.23%
Total Polled	68,128	73.22%	304,847	71.53%	9,449,878	76.03%
Registered Electors	93,040		426,193		12,428,762	

=== 2000 Sri Lankan Parliamentary Election ===
Party	Chilaw		Puttalam Electoral District		Sri Lanka	
Party	Votes	%	Votes	%	Votes	%
PA	30,124	47.91%	138,747	48.40%	3,899,329	45.33%
UNP	28,110	44.70%	118,566	41.36%	3,451,765	40.12%
JVP	2,558	4.07%	11,256	3.93%	518,725	6.03%
Other Parties (with < 1%)	1,256	2.00%	5,809	2.03%	236,331	2.75%
NUA	833	1.32%	12,317	4.30%	185,593	2.16%
Valid Votes	62,881	N/A	286,695	N/A	8,602,617	N/A

=== 1994 Sri Lankan Parliamentary Election ===
Party	Chilaw		Puttalam Electoral District		Sri Lanka	
Party	Votes	%	Votes	%	Votes	%
PA	31,999	51.91%	150,587	53.64%	3,887,805	48.94%
UNP	29,076	47.17%	127,671	45.48%	3,498,370	44.04%
Other Parties (with < 1%)	567	0.92%	2,453	0.87%	158,616	2.00%
Valid Votes	61,642	95.77%	280,711	95.52%	7,943,688	95.20%
Rejected Votes	2,723	4.23%	13,144	4.47%	400,395	4.80%
Total Polled	64,365	77.49%	293,873	76.19%	8,344,095	74.75%
Registered Electors	83,057		385,690		11,163,064	

=== 1989 Sri Lankan Parliamentary Election ===
Party	Chilaw		Puttalam Electoral District		Sri Lanka	
Party	Votes	%	Votes	%	Votes	%
UNP	30,573	61.53%	139,309	62.62%	2,838,005	50.71%
SLFP	17,456	35.13%	71,687	32.22%	1,785,369	31.90%
Other Parties (with < 1%)	957	1.93%	5,226	2.35%	211,176	3.77%
SLMC	699	1.41%	6,253	2.81%	202,016	3.61%
Valid Votes	49,685	94.61%	222,475	94.40%	5,596,468	93.87%
Rejected Votes	2,832	5.39%	13,205	5.60%	365,563	6.13%
Total Polled	52,517	75.30%	235,680	73.94%	5,962,031	63.60%
Registered Electors	69,743		318,755		9,374,164	

== Demographics ==
=== Ethnicity ===
The Chilaw Polling Division has a Sinhalese majority (76.7%) and a significant Moor population (13.5%) . In comparison, the Puttalam Electoral District (which contains the Chilaw Polling Division) has a Sinhalese majority (73.6%) and a significant Moor population (19.4%)

Ethnicity in Chilaw
1. Sinhalese (76.7%)
2. Moor (13.5%)
3. Sri Lankan Tamil (9.30%)
4. Other (0.50%)

=== Religion ===
The Chilaw Polling Division has a Buddhist plurality (46.9%), a significant Roman Catholic population (30.6%) and a significant Muslim population (13.8%) . In comparison, the Puttalam Electoral District (which contains the Chilaw Polling Division) has a Buddhist plurality (43.2%), a significant Roman Catholic population (31.5%) and a significant Muslim population (19.7%)

Religion in Chilaw
1. Buddhist (46.9%)
2. Roman Catholic (30.6%)
3. Muslim (13.8%)
4. Hindu (6.90%)
5. Other Christian (1.90%)
6. Other (0.00%)
