= Mahawewa Divisional Secretariat =

- Divisional Secretariat
- Interactive map of Mahawewa Divisional Secretariat
- Country: Sri Lanka
- Province: North Western Province
- District: Puttalam District
- Time zone: UTC+5:30 (Sri Lanka Standard Time)

Mahawewa Divisional Secretariat is a Divisional Secretariat of Puttalam District, of North Western Province, Sri Lanka.

== Demography-Religion ==
Religion in Mahawewa DS Division (2012)
1. Buddhist (45.4%)
2. Hindu (0.80%)
3. Muslim (0.10%)
4. Roman Catholic (51.8%)
5. Other Christian (2.00%)
6. Other (0.00%)
