= Madurankuli =

Madurankuliya මදුරන්කුලිය மதுரங்குளி
- town
- Location within Sri Lanka
- Coordinates: 7°53′36″N 79°49′20″E
- Country: Sri Lanka
- Province: North Western Province, Sri Lanka
- District: Puttalam District
- Police Division: Mandurankuli Police Station
- A.G.A Division: Mundalama Divisional Secretariat
- City Acronym: MDK
- Local Authority: Puttalam Pradeshiya Sabha

Area
  - Total: 43.3 km^{2} (16.7 sq mi)
- Elevation: 2.7432 m (9.000 ft)

Population
  - Total: 3,000+
- Demonym: Madurankuliyan
- Time zone: UTC+05:30 (SLST)
- Postal Code: 61270
- Area Code: 032

Madurankuliya (Sinhala: මදුරන්කුලිය, Madurankuliya, Tamil: மதுரங்குளி), also abbreviated MDK, is a town that is located between Puttalam and Chilaw in North Western Province, Sri Lanka. The town is connected by roads and a railway network. It is located 114 km (71 miles) from the centre of the commercial capital Colombo. It contains over 3,000 people.

Madurankuliya is a growing commercial and agricultural area that is known for trading activities, agriculture and exports of coconuts, copra, salts, oil, prawns and vegetables.

== Climate ==
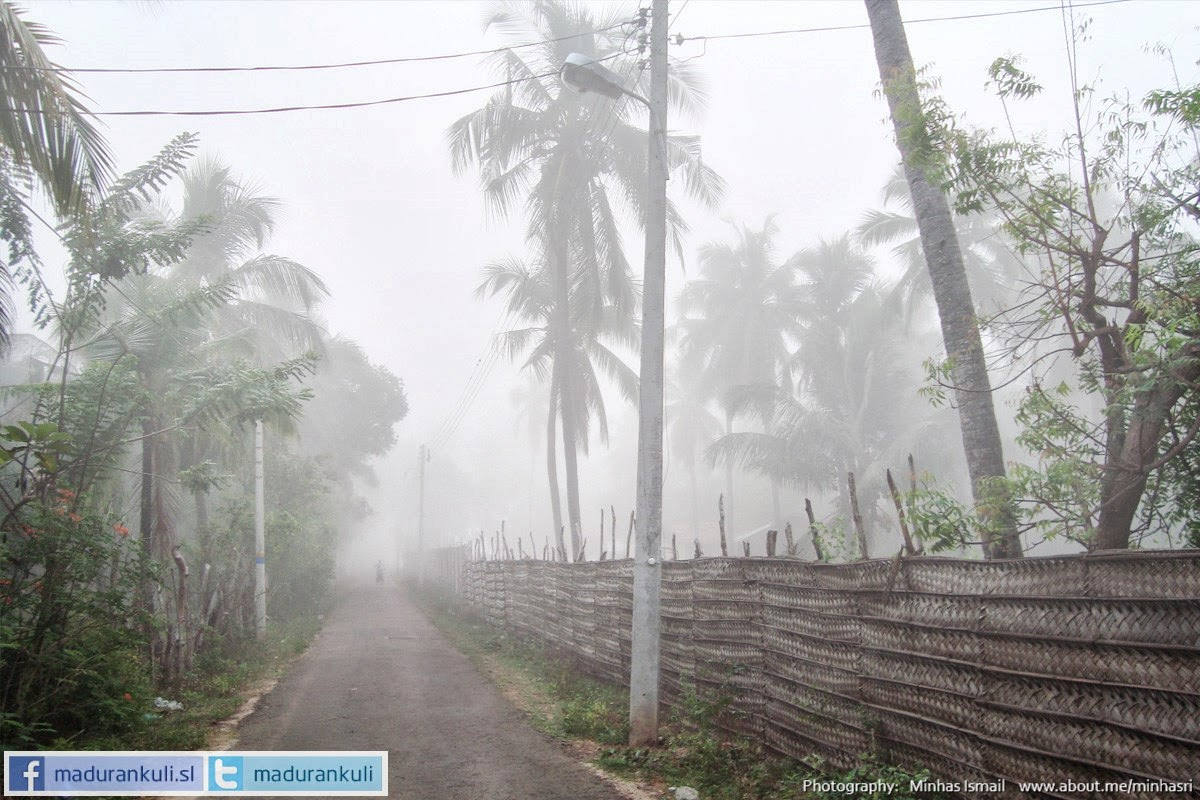
Misty morning in Madurankuliya

The climate of Madurankuliya is tropical with a marked dry season and temperatures averaging between 26 °C (79 °F) in January to 30 °C (86 °F) in April and May. Rainfall averages around 2,000 mm (79 in) per year.

Climate data for Madurankuliya, Sri Lanka
Month	Jan	Feb	Mar	Apr	May	Jun	Jul	Aug	Sep	Oct	Nov	Dec	Year
Mean daily maximum °C (°F)	30 (86)	31 (88)	33 (91)	34 (93)	34 (93)	32 (90)	32 (90)	32 (90)	32 (90)	31 (88)	30 (86)	29 (84)	32 (90)
Mean daily minimum °C (°F)	22 (72)	22 (72)	24 (75)	26 (79)	26 (79)	25 (77)	24 (75)	24 (75)	24 (75)	24 (75)	23 (73)	22 (72)	24 (75)
Average precipitation mm (inches)	16 (0.6)	19 (0.7)	22 (0.9)	63 (2.5)	54 (2.1)	87 (3.4)	130 (5.1)	140 (5.5)	111 (4.4)	192 (7.6)	141 (5.6)	71 (2.8)	1,046 (41.2)
Average precipitation days	1	1	2	3	3	2	3	4	5	8	7	4	43
Source: World Climate Guide. To check the current Weather - Visit: http://www.worldweatheronline.com/Madurankuli-weather/North-Western/LK.aspx
