= Galagedara, Western Province =

Galagedara ගලගෙදර கலகெதரா
- Location within Sri Lanka
- Coordinates: 6°51′0″N 80°05′0″E
- Province: Western Province
- Time zone: UTC+5:30 (Sri Lanka Standard Time Zone)
  - Summer (DST): UTC+6

Galagedara (Sinhala: ගලගෙදර, Tamil: கலகெதரா) is a village in the Western Province of Sri Lanka.
