= Chilaw Divisional Secretariat =

- Divisional Secretariat
- Interactive map of Chilaw Divisional Secretariat
- Country: Sri Lanka
- Province: North Western Province
- District: Puttalam District
- Time zone: UTC+5:30 (Sri Lanka Standard Time)

Chilaw Divisional Secretariat is a Divisional Secretariat of Puttalam District, of North Western Province, Sri Lanka.

== Demography-Religion ==
Religion in Chilaw DS Division (2012)
1. Buddhist (36.6%)
2. Hindu (6.90%)
3. Muslim (8.30%)
4. Roman Catholic (45.7%)
5. Other Christian (2.60%)
6. Other (0.00%)
