= List of settlements in North Western Province (Sri Lanka) =

North Western Province is a province of Sri Lanka, containing the Kurunegala District and Puttalam District. The following is a list of settlements in the province.

== A ==
- Abakolawewa
- Abbowa
- Abokkagama
- Achari Hinukwewa
- Achari Ihalagama

== B ==
- Baburugama
- Badabadda
- Badabeddegama
- Badabeddewa
- Badagane
- Bakmeegolla

== C ==
- Cement Factory
- Chandrayagama
- Chenaikudirippu
- Chenaikudiyirippu
- Chenakudiruppu
- Chettichena
- Chettisena
- Chettychena
- Chilan
- Chilaw

== D ==
- Dabarayaya
- Dachchilanda
- Dadapolagama
- Dadapolagamuwa
- Dagama

== E ==
- Ebawalapitiya
- Ebawalayaya
- Edandewela
- Edandupitiya
- Egalla
- Eluvankulam

== G ==
- Gaane
- Gadolwaka
- Gahalagaswela
- Gahalagaswewa
- Gaiyala

== H ==
- Habagama
- Habaragahamada
- Habarawa
- Habarawewa
- Habarewa

== I ==
- Ibbagamuwa
- Ibbawela
- Ichchampitiya
- Ichchankadu
- Ichchankaudu

== J ==
- Jagama
- Jahapagama
- Jakaduwa
- Jalatgama
- Jankurawela
- Jankure
- Jayalatgama
- Jayalathgama
- Jayarajapuraya
- Jayasirigama
- Jayasundaragedara
- Jayasurigama

== K ==
- Kaaradumunai
- Kabalewa
- Kachchakaduwa
- Karaitivu (Puttalam)
- Kachcheri
- Kachchimadurankuli
- Kachchirawa

== L ==
- Labugala
- Labuyaya
- Lakadagolla
- Landawatta
- Lankarangedara
- Lenawa

== M ==
- Mabo
- Mabopitiya
- Madadenigama
- Madadombe
- Madagama
- Maha Danvila
- Mawathagama

== N ==
- Nabadapokuna
- Nabadawa
- Nabadawala
- Nabadawela
- Nabadawewa

== O ==
- Obadakotuwa
- Obedagedere
- Obodakotuwa
- Odakkarai
- Oggamuwa

== P ==
- Pabuluwa
- Puttalam
- Palavi
- Pachchakadumundal
- Pachchalawela
- Pachchalawewa
- Pachchalewa

== R ==
- Rachchiragama
- Rada Hilogama
- Rada Paliyagama
- Rada Talanpola
- Radadena
- Ridigama

== S ==
- Saidalapitiya
- Saldalpitiya
- Samaderapitiyal
- Samagigama
- Samagiriyawewa

== T ==
- Tabbomulla
- Tabbowa
- Tailagama
- Talagalla
- Talagaswewa

== U ==
- Uda Horombuwa
- Uda Inguruwatta
- Uda Kahahena
- Uda Siyambalewa
- Uda Tammannewa

== V ==
- Vairankattuwa
- Vannativillu
- Vattakandal
- Velandikulama
- Velantikulam
- Velasiya
- Vellamundal
- Vellankarai
- Vicharanagama
- Vidatamunai
- Vidyalaya
- Viharegama
- Villuke
- Virakammandaluwa
- Viruthodai

== W ==
- Wadakada
- Wadakahagala
- Wadakkarawewa
- Wadatta
- Wadawa
- Wadawa

== See also ==
- List of cities in Sri Lanka
- List of towns in Sri Lanka
