= Puttalam District =

Puttalam District පුත්තලම දිස්ත්‍රික්කය புத்தளம் மாவட்டம்
- Administrative District
- Map of Sri Lanka with Puttalam District highlighted
- Coordinates: 08°0′N 80°0′E
- Country: Sri Lanka
- Province: North Western Province
- Largest town: Puttalam

Government
  - District Secretary: H. M. S. P. Herath

Area
  - Total: 3,072 km^{2} (1,186 sq mi)
  - Land: 2,882 km^{2} (1,113 sq mi)
  - Water: 190 km^{2} (73 sq mi)

Population (2012)
  - Total: 760,778
  - Density: 264.0/km^{2} (683.7/sq mi)
- Time zone: UTC+05:30 (Sri Lanka)
- ISO 3166 code: LK-62
- Website: www.puttalam.dist.gov.lk

Puttalam is a district of Sri Lanka situated near the west coast of the country. The district has an area of 3,072 km^{2} (1,186 mi^{2}). Along with the Kurunegala District, it forms the North Western Province of Sri Lanka. The district capital is Puttalam, which borders the Kala Oya and Modaragam Aru in the north, Anuradhapura District and Kurunegala District in the east, Ma Oya in the south, and the Indian Ocean in the west. Puttalam has lagoons, popular for shallow sea fishing and prawn farming activities.

== History ==
In 1845, North Western Province was created. In 1958, Puttalam district was merged with Chilaw district. There are 548 GN division in the area. These areas are governed by the 16 Divisional Secretary areas.

== List of Divisional Secretary areas in Puttalam district ==
- Anamaduwa Divisional Secretariat
- Arachchikattuwa Divisional Secretariat
- Chilaw Divisional Secretariat
- Dankotuwa Divisional Secretariat
- Kalpitiya Divisional Secretariat
- Karuwalagaswewa Divisional Secretariat
- Madampe Divisional Secretariat
- Mahakumbukkadawala Divisional Secretariat
- Mahawewa Divisional Secretariat
- Mundalama Divisional Secretariat
- Nattandiya Divisional Secretariat
- Nawagattegama Divisional Secretariat
- Pallama Divisional Secretariat
- Puttalam Divisional Secretariat
- Vanathavilluwa Divisional Secretariat
- Wennappuwa Divisional Secretariat

== Demographics ==
Ethnicity in Puttalam District (2024)
1. Sinhala (72.3%)
2. Sri Lankan Moors (21.3%)
3. Sri Lankan Tamils (5.93%)
4. Others (0.49%)

Religion in Puttalam district (2024)
Religion	Percent
Buddhism	44.11%
Catholicism	29.43%
Islam	21.61%
Hinduism	3.52%
Other Christianity	1.30%
Other or not stated	0.01%

Buddhism is the major religion in the district, and has been since the early part of the Anuradhapura Kingdom. The second-most common religion is Roman Catholicism. In addition to two of the above major religions, Hinduism, Christianity and Islam are well established in the area. Munneswaram Hindu Temple and St Anne's Church, Thalawila, are among the historical religious places in the area.

== Major cities ==
- Puttalam (Urban Council)
- Chilaw (Urban Council)

== Other towns ==
- Adippala
- Ambakandawila
- Anamaduwa
- Anawilundawa
- Arachikattuwa
- Bangadeniya
- Battuluoya
- Dankotuwa
- Eluvankulam
- Kalladiya
- Kalpitiya
- Madampe
- Madurankuliya
- Mahawewa
- Marawila
- Mundel
- Nagavillu
- Nathandiya
- Nattandiya
- Nuraicholai
- Palaviya
- Thigali
- Thillayadi
- Udappu
- Vanathavilluwa
- Wennappuwa

== Traffic ==
Puttalam District is served by Puttalam line, a railway line linking Ragama near Colombo to Puttalam. Puttalam Railway Station is 135 km (84 mi) north of Colombo.

== See also ==
- Districts of Sri Lanka
