= North Western Province, Sri Lanka =

Province of Sri Lanka

North Western Province වයඹ පළාත வட மேல் மாகாணம்
- Province
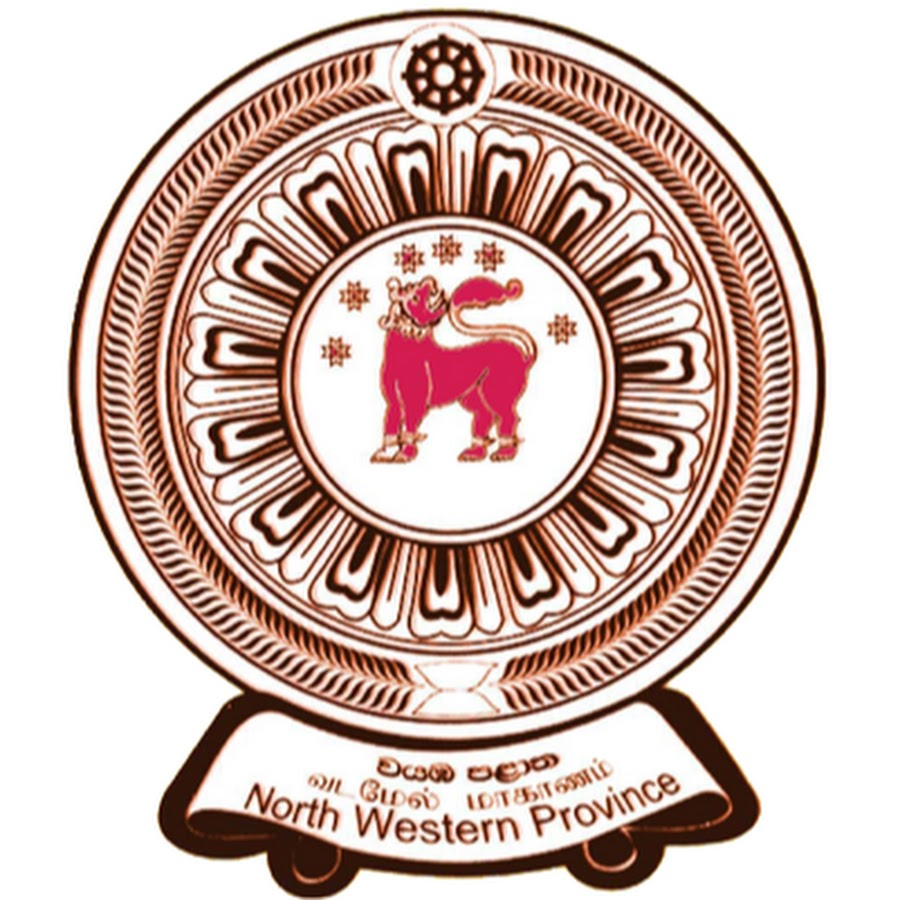
- Flag

- Location within Sri Lanka
- Country: Sri Lanka
- Created: 1833
- Admitted: 14 November 1987
- Capital: Kurunegala
- Largest City: Kurunegala
- Districts: List: Puttalam; Kurunegala

Government
  - Governor: Tissa Kumarasiri
  - Chief Minister: Vacant
  - Chief Secretary: Deepika K. Gunaratna

Area
  - Total: 7,888 km^{2} (3,046 sq mi)
  - Rank: 4th (11.89% of total area)

Population (2024 census)
  - Total: 2,586,972
  - Rank: 4th (11.61% of total pop.)
  - Density: 328.6/km^{2} (851/sq mi)

Gross Regional Product (2022)
  - Total: USD 8.5 billion
  - Rank: 2nd (11.2 % of total)
- Time zone: UTC+05:30 (Sri Lanka)
- ISO 3166 code: LK-6
- Vehicle registration: NW
- Official Languages: Sinhalese, Tamil
- Website: www.nw.gov.lk

North Western Province (Sinhala: වයඹ පළාත Wayamba Paḷāta, Tamil: வட மேல் மாகாணம் Vada Mael Mākāṇam) is a province of Sri Lanka. It is the fourth-largest province by land area, covering 7,888 km^{2} (3,046 sq mi), and the fourth-most populated province with a population of over 2,592,000 people. The majority of the population is concentrated in Kurunegala, which is the provincial capital. Kurunegala is the larger city in the province and serves as a commercial hub. Puttalam, located on the western coast, is known for its lagoon, and being a centre for salt production.

The region has numerous archaeological sites, including the ancient rock fortress of Yapahuwa and the Panduwasnuwara ruins. European colonization began with the Portuguese Empire in the 16th century, followed by the Dutch Empire and the British Empire. The province was established in its current form in 1833 during British Ceylon era.

North Western Province had nineteen seats in the Sri Lankan Parliament in last General elections. The provincial council consists of the Chief Minister, the Provincial Council, and the Governor. As of the most recent General elections, the Sri Lanka Podujana Peramuna is the dominant political party in the province. The Governor of North Western Province, the representative of the President of Sri Lanka, is currently Tissa Kumarasiri Warnasuriya.

The economy of North Western Province is primarily based on Agriculture, Manufacturing, Fishing, Salt, and small-scale industries. Major agricultural products include coconut, rice, and spices, while the coastal areas are known for their fishing industry, the urban areas such as Kurunegala, Kuliyapitiya, Nikaweratiya and Mawathagama is famous for their Industries. The northern part of puttalam has significant mineral resources, including limestone and ilmenite.

Puttalam district in the North Western Province is especially known for its cultural heritage, with numerous festivals, traditional dances, and local crafts. It is home to several important religious sites, including the Munneswaram temple and the St. Anne's Church in Thalawila, which attract pilgrims from across the country. The province's natural attractions, such as the Wilpattu National Park and the Puttalam Lagoon, are popular with tourists.

== Geography ==
North Western Province is bordered by the North Central Province to the north, Central Province to the east, Sabaragamuwa Province to the southeast, Western Province to the south, and the Indian Ocean to the west.

The province is characterised by a variety of topographical and climatic conditions, ranging from coastal regions with a tropical climate to inland areas that experience a more varied climate. The region features several prominent water bodies, including the Puttalam Lagoon, Mundal Lagoon, and the Deduru Oya. Other significant rivers in the province include the Mee Oya and the Kala Oya rivers. The province also contains a portion of the Wilpattu National Park, one of the largest and oldest national parks in Sri Lanka, known for its diverse wildlife and natural beauty.

The region's highest point is the Dolukanda range, which is part of the central hills that gently slope towards the coastal plains. The plains are predominantly used for agriculture, with key crops including paddy, coconut, and various spices. The province also has significant limestone deposits, which contribute to the local cement industry.

The province is ecologically diverse, with coastal ecosystems, dry monsoon forests, and wetlands. Significant ecological areas include the Anawilundawa Wetland Sanctuary, recognised as a Ramsar Wetland of International Importance, and the Mangrove forests along the coastline. These areas support a variety of flora and fauna, including several Endangered species.

=== Climate ===
The climate of Wayamba is tropical, with a marked dry season, and temperatures averaging between 20 °C (68 °F) in January to 25 °C (77 °F) in March. The south of the province is wetter, with almost 2,000 mm (79 in) of rainfall per year, but the north of the province is one of the driest regions in Sri Lanka, averaging under 1,100 mm (43 in) of rain in parts.

== Demographic details ==
Ethnicity in North Western Province (2024)
1. Sinhala (84.8%)
2. Sri Lankan Moors (12.2%)
3. Sri Lankan Tamils (2.72%)
4. Others (0.29%)

The population of North Western Province in the year 2021 was 2,592,000. The majority of the population belongs to the Sinhalese majority. Sri Lankan Moors community represent a large portion in population. There is a smaller Sri Lankan Tamils community and they are scattered all over the Province but a larger population reside in the North of Puttalam District. The following Table summarises the population of the province according to their ethnicity:

Ethnicity	Percentage
Sinhalese	85%
Sri Lankan Moors	12%
Sri Lankan Tamil	3%

=== Religion ===
Religion in North Western Province (2024)
1. Buddhism (74.2%)
2. Islam (12.4%)
3. Catholicism (10.9%)
4. Hinduism (1.79%)
5. Other Christianity (0.77%)
6. Others (0.02%)

Buddhism is the main and the most widely practiced religion in North Western Province. It is also home to a wide range of other religious faiths and sects including Islam, Christianity, and Hinduism. Even among them almost all Muslim population follows Sunni Islam and the preponderance of Christians follow Catholicism, predomantly in Puttalam District.

Religion	Population (2012)
Buddhism	1,761,337
Christianity	305,951
Islam	268,709
Hinduism	43,532

== Districts ==
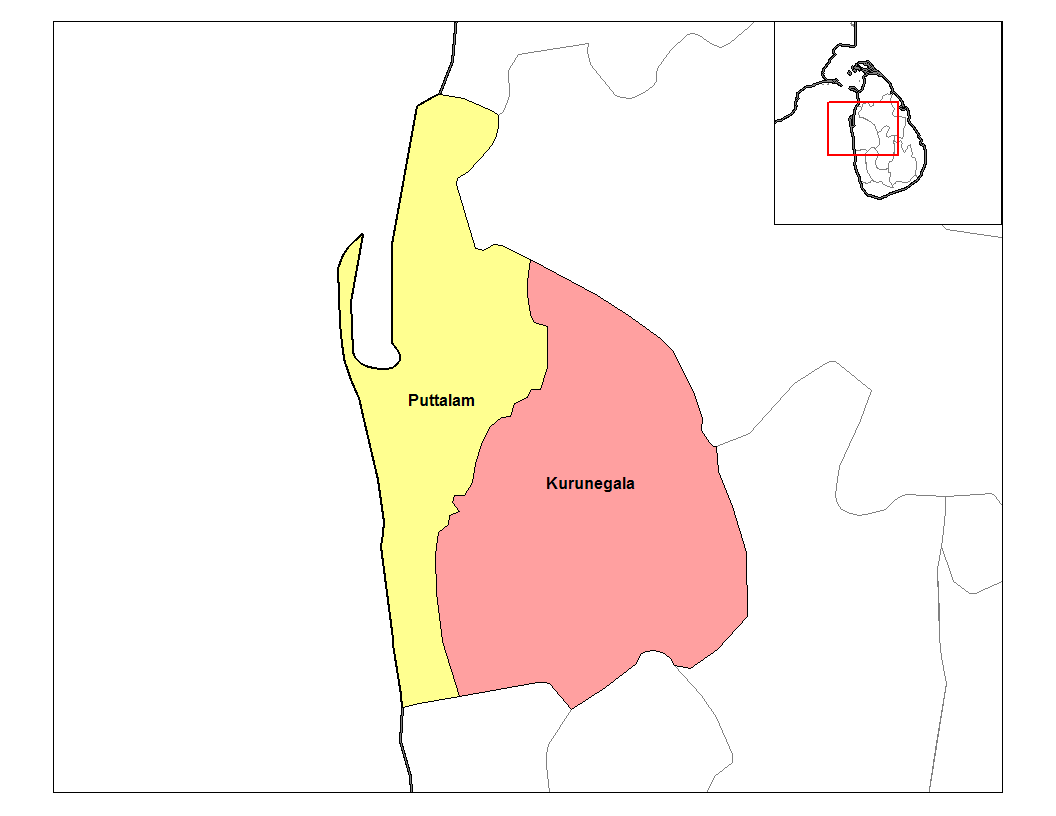
Kurunegala and Puttalam are the two districts that make up the North Western Province.

Wayamba is divided into 2 districts:

- Kurunegala District 4,771 km^{2} (1,842 sq mi)
- Puttalam District 2,976 km^{2} (1,149 sq mi)

== Cities ==
- Kurunegala (Municipal Council)

== Large towns ==
- Puttalam (Urban Council)
- Kuliyapitiya (Urban Council)
- Chilaw (Urban Council)

== Other towns ==
- Alawwa
- Anamaduwa
- Bingiriya
- Bolawatta
- Dankotuwa
- Galgamuwa
- Giriulla
- Hettipola
- Hiripitiya
- Kalpitiya
- Kumarakattuwa
- Madampe
- Maho
- Marawila
- Mawathagama
- Narammala
- Nattandiya
- Nikaweratiya
- Pannala
- Polpithigama
- Madurankuli
- Wariyapola
- Wennappuwa
- Pallama
- Polgahawela
- Udappu

== Villages ==
North Western Province contains six villages with the same name, Galagedara.

== Politics ==
The 2020 parliament election was the most recent general election.

=== Members of Parliament ===
Name	Votes	District	Party
Mahinda Rajapaksa	527,364	Kurunegala	SLPP
Johnston Fernando	199,203	Kurunegala	SLPP
Gunapala Rathnasekara	141,991	Kurunegala	SLPP
Dayasiri Jayasekara	112,452	Kurunegala	SLPP
Asanka Nawaratne	82,779	Kurunegala	SLPP
D. B. Herath	61,954	Kurunegala	SLPP
Jayarathna Herath	54,351	Kurunegala	SLPP
Shantha Bandara	52,086	Kurunegala	SLPP
Sumith Udukumbura	51,134	Kurunegala	SLPP
Nalin Bandara	75,631	Kurunegala	SJB
J.C.Alawathuwala	65,956	Kurunegala	SJB
Ashok Abeysinghe	54,512	Kurunegala	SJB
Thushara Indunil	49,364	Kurunegala	SJB
Sanath Nishantha	80,082	Puttalam	SLPP
Priyankara Fernando	74,425	Puttalam	SLPP
Arundika Fernando	70,892	Puttalam	SLPP
Chinthaka Mayadunne	46,058	Puttalam	SLPP
Ashoka Priyantha	41,612	Puttalam	SLPP
Hector Appuhamy	34,127	Puttalam	SJB
Niroshan Perera	31,636	Puttalam	SJB
Ali Sabri Raheem	33,509	Puttalam	ACMC

== Education ==
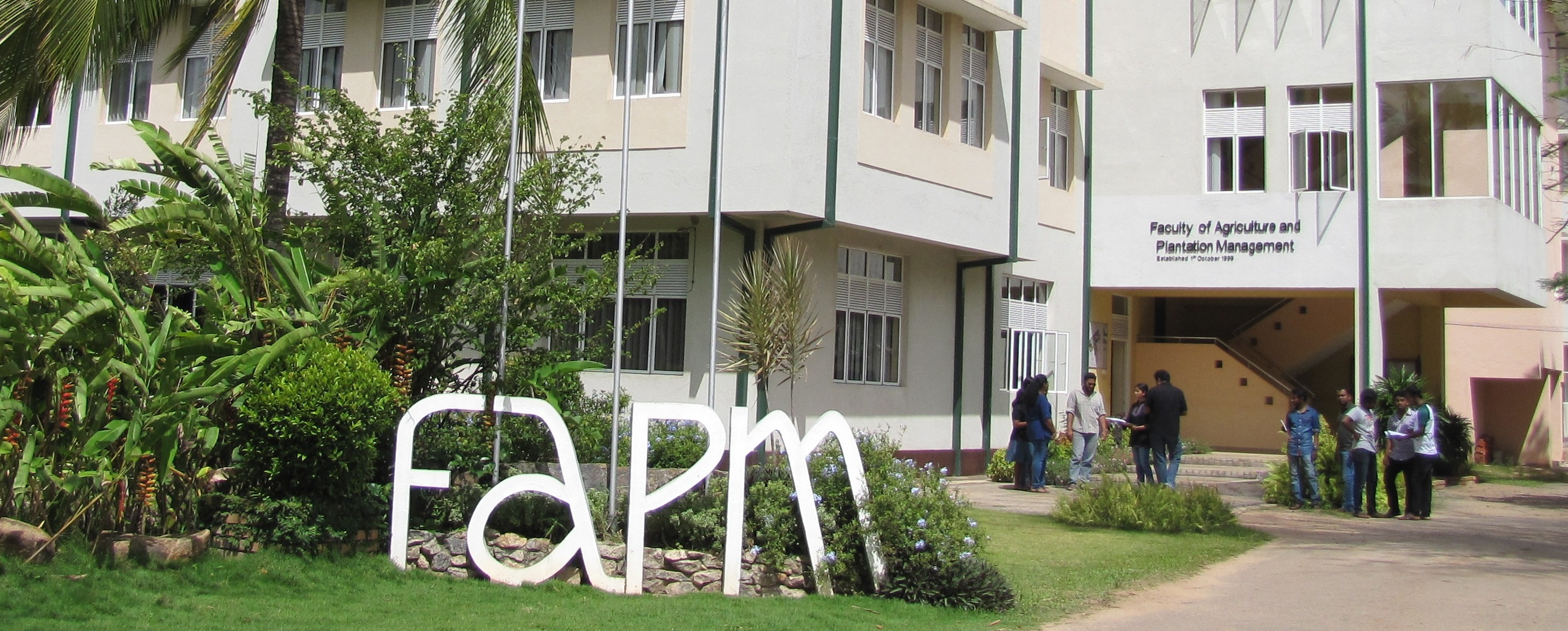
Faculty of Agriculture & Plantation Management, Wayamba University of Sri Lanka

=== Universities ===
1. Open University of Sri Lanka, regional centre of Kurunegala
2. Wayamba University of Sri Lanka, Kuliyapitiya
3. Sri Lanka Institute of Information Technology - Kurunegala
4. Sri Lanka Institute of Advanced Technological Education - Kurunegala
5. Wayamba National College of Education, Bingiriya
6. ICBT Campus
7. ESOFT Metro Campus

=== Schools ===
1. Maliyadeva College - Kurunegala
2. St. Anne's College, Kurunegala - Kurunegala
3. Athugalpura Prince College - Kurunegala
4. Maliyadeva Girls' College - Kurunegala
5. Holy Family Convent - Kurunegala
6. Sir John Kothalawala College - Kurunegala
7. St. Joseph Vaz College - Wennappuwa
8. Presidential Science College - Puttalam
9. Holy Family Convent - Marawila
10. Saranath College - Kuliyapitiya
11. Central College - Kuliyapitiya
12. Ananda College - Chilaw
13. Mawatagama Central College - Mawathagama
14. Dhammissara College - Nattandiya
15. Wayamba Royal College - Kurunegala
16. Senanayake Central College - Madampe
17. Mayurapada College - Narammala
18. Sri Sumangala College - Wariyapola
19. S.W.R.D. Bandaranayaka Central College - Panduwasnuwara
20. Zahira National College - Puttalam
21. St. Andrew's Central College - Puttlam
22. Anuruddha Central College - Lunuwila National School
23. Sri Saranankara National College - Bingiriya
24. Mahindodaya National Collage - Hettipola

== Transportation ==
=== Roads ===
Some major roads include,

- A3: Puttalam – Chilaw – Negombo - Colombo (162 km)
- A6: Ambepussa – Kurunegala – Dambulla – Trincomalee (192 km)
- A10: Katugastota – Kurunegala – Puttalam (125 km)
- A12: Puttalam – Anuradhapura – Trincomalee (179 km)

=== Buses ===
The Road and Passenger Transport Authority – North Western Province provides bus services in the province. As of 2026, it operated 1,419 buses and had an average daily patronage of approximately 363,000 passengers.

=== Railway lines ===
- The Northern line travels through the eastern part of the province, serving Kurunegala and nearby towns.
- The 133 km long Puttalam line was completed in 1926. It follows the coast and connects Colombo with Chilaw and Puttalam via Negombo.

== Industries ==
This region's economy is driven by agriculture, manufacturing, mining, and service industries.

=== Agriculture ===
Agriculture is the cornerstone of the North Western Province's economy, employing a significant portion of the population. With over 150,000 hectares dedicated to paddy fields, the region produces around 700,000 metric tonnes of rice annually, or 18% of the national total. The province is one of the largest coconut-producing regions, accounting for about 1 billion coconuts per year, which is 25% of the national coconut output. Approximately 10,000 ha (25,000 acres) are used for growing spices like pepper and cardamom, producing around 12,000 metric tonnes annually. There are two main cultivation seasons. The Maha Season (October–January) or the wet season, and the Yala Season (April–August) the dry season.

Other crops grown in the province include:

- Cereals – Kurakkan, maize, green gram, cowpea
- Root Crops – sweet potatoes, red onions
- Fruits – Pineapples, Mangoes, Papaya, Banana, Avocado
- Vegetables – Gherkin, Asparagus
- Cashew Nut is also cultivated on a large scale. The northernmost dry region is ideally suited for Cashew cultivation.
- Fisheries Industry and Prawn Farming - The major varieties found in abundance off the coast are tuna, prawns, lobsters and cuttlefish. The country's export-oriented commercial prawn farming industry is concentrated in the coastal areas of the Puttalam district.

=== Manufacturing ===
Manufacturing in the North Western Province is diverse, playing a crucial role in the region's economic growth. The textile and garment industry employs over 50,000 workers. The region hosts several factories, contributing to around 20% of Sri Lanka's total garment exports.The province is home to multiple food processing plants. The food and beverage sector contributes approximately LKR 20 billion to the provincial GDP annually. Puttalam has the second largest cement factory in Sri Lanka, producing about 1.3 million tonnes of cement each year.

=== Mining ===
The North Western Province's limestone deposits are crucial for the cement industry. Annually, around 3 million tonnes of limestone are mined in Puttalam. The province is a significant source of silica sand, essential for the glass industry, with annual production reaching approximately 200,000 tonnes. Other minerals mined include clay, ilmenite, beach mineral sands, mica and graphite.

=== Service Industry ===
The healthcare sector employs over 15,000 workers and includes major hospitals and numerous healthcare facilities across the province. This includes variety of private hospitals mainly located in Kurunegala. The education sector is robust, with numerous schools, vocational training centers, and higher education institutions. Over 200,000 students are enrolled in educational institutions within the province. The province has seen a steady increase in tourism, Major attractions include the Wilpattu National Park, cultural heritage sites in Kurunegala, and the coastal areas of Puttalam. Tourism however is considered very poor compared to other provinces.

=== Energy Production ===
Energy production is a significant industry in the North Western Province, particularly in Puttalam. Puttalam is home to one of the largest wind farms in Sri Lanka, contributing over 100 MW of renewable energy to the national grid. Norochcholai Power Plant, also located in Puttalam, is the largest coal-fired power plant in Sri Lanka, generating around 900 MW of electricity.

== Attractions ==
=== Archaeological sites ===
The province is a treasure house of archaeology having been the seat of four medieval kingdoms between the mid 12th and mid 14th centuries. These kings built magnificent citadels at Yapahuwa, Panduwasnuwara, Dambadeniya and Kurunegala.

=== Rock temples ===
There are also other ancient Buddhist rock temples, mostly with 1st century BCE roots, with wall and ceiling frescos, colossal Buddha images, stone inscriptions and sculptures dating from early medieval to 18th century period.

=== Beaches ===
The western shores of the Wayamba province feature 240 kilometers of beaches extending from Waikkal in the south to Dutch Bay in the Puttalam district, bordered by the Indian Ocean and tropical lagoons.

Marawila, Talwila, Kalpitiya, and Waikkal host several resort beaches in the Wayamba province, frequently featuring lagoon or river frontages suited for beach holidays. Additional local attractions include coral formations near Kandakuliya and Karaitivu, alongside numerous surrounding fishing villages.

== European colonial monuments ==
The well-preserved Dutch Fort in Kalpitiya (Puttalam district) dating back to 1670 is an evidence of the Wayamba's European colonial period. The fort is complete with barracks, store houses and living quarters, Dutch colonial pillars and ancient tombstones. Kurunegala has many 19th-century relics of the British colonial period, including the government Agent's residence and the Rajapihilla rest house.

== Festivals ==
The people of Wayamba celebrate many traditional festivals centred on sacred shrines of diverse faith.

- All Buddhist temples celebrate the Vesak, Poson and Esela festivals commemorating the events of great importance to the Buddhists. These festivals feature colourful decorations, lanterns, illuminations and pageants where traditional dancing, drumming, costumed dignitaries and elephants are paraded. Two noteworthy colourful Buddhist processions are organised by the Wilbawa Raja Maha Viharaya (major temple) and Athanda Raja Maha Viharaya and are paraded in the Kurunegala city.
- The St Anne's Roman Catholic church is located on a magnificent beach stretch in Talawila in the Puttalam district. The church draws thousands of pilgrims for its main festivals in March and July.
- The Munneswaram and Udappu Hindu temples are pilgrim centres of many devotees. People gather to worship deities and seek favours. The main temple of God Shiva at Munneswaram, comprises the shrines and has been built according to traditional Hindu style. Munneswaram celebrates its major festival in August where fire-walking is practiced. Udappuwa, a sea side shrine complex of three shrines, also has a colourful festival held in the month of August.
- The Ramazan, Haj and Milad-un-Nabi festivals are also celebrated by the minority Muslims of Wayamba especially at historic and famed mosques in Puttalam, Kurunegala and Chilaw. These celebrations are mainly of religious character, recitations of Koran and distribution of cooked food and sweets.

All three shrines are easily accessible from Kurunegala, - Munneswaram approximately 70 km, Udappuwa 95 km and St. Anne's about 110 km respectively.

== Research institutes ==
- Coconut Research Institute, Lunuwila
- Rice Research and Development Institute, Batalagoda

== See also ==
- List of settlements in North Western Province (Sri Lanka)
- Provinces of Sri Lanka
- Districts of Sri Lanka
