= Mullipuram Grama Niladhari Division =

Mullipuram
- Grama Niladhari Division
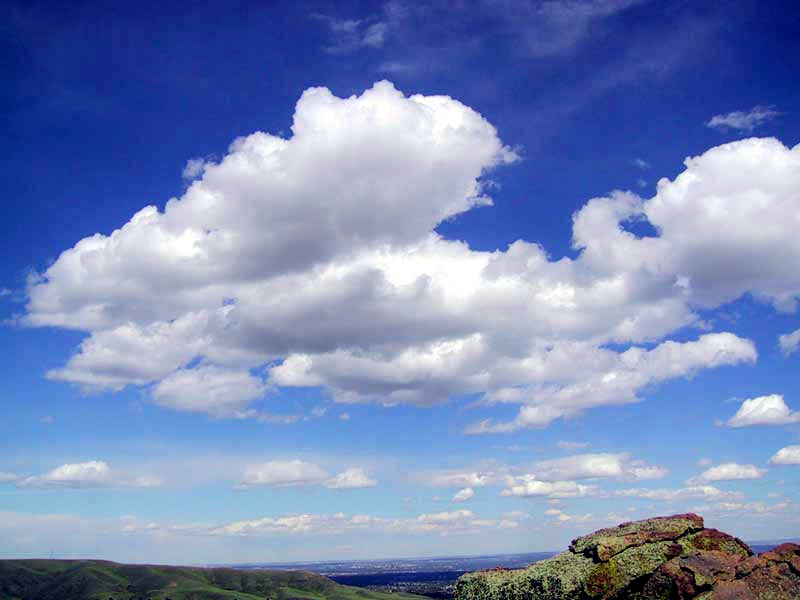
- Seguwantivu and Vidatamunai Wind Farms is located within, nearby or associated with the Mullipuram Grama Niladhari Division
- Interactive map of Mullipuram
- Coordinates: 8.057164°N 79.808022°E
- Country: Sri Lanka
- Province: North Western Province
- District: Puttalam District
- Divisional Secretariat: Puttalam Divisional Secretariat
- Electoral District: Puttalam Electoral District
- Polling Division: Puttalam Polling Division

Area
  - Total: 6.86 km^{2} (2.65 sq mi)
- Elevation: 11 m (36 ft)

Population (2012)
  - Total: 3,654
  - Density: 533/km^{2} (1,380/sq mi)
- ISO 3166 code: LK-6215030

Mullipuram

Mullipuram Grama Niladhari Division is a Grama Niladhari Division of the Puttalam Divisional Secretariat of Puttalam District of North Western Province, Sri Lanka . It has Grama Niladhari Division Code 617A.

Seguwantivu and Vidatamunai Wind Farms are located within, nearby or associated with Mullipuram.

Mullipuram is a surrounded by the Manalthivu, Marikkar Street and Pudukudirippuwa Grama Niladhari Divisions.

== Demographics ==
=== Ethnicity ===
The Mullipuram Grama Niladhari Division has a Moor majority (96.7%) . In comparison, the Puttalam Divisional Secretariat (which contains the Mullipuram Grama Niladhari Division) has a Moor majority (63.3%) and a significant Sinhalese population (26.6%)

Ethnicity in Mullipuram
1. Moor (96.7%)
2. Sri Lankan Tamil (2.70%)
3. Other (0.70%)

=== Religion ===
The Mullipuram Grama Niladhari Division has a Muslim majority (96.7%) . In comparison, the Puttalam Divisional Secretariat (which contains the Mullipuram Grama Niladhari Division) has a Muslim majority (64.2%), a significant Buddhist population (18.2%) and a significant Roman Catholic population (10.1%)

Religion in Mullipuram
1. Muslim (96.7%)
2. Hindu (3.00%)
3. Other (0.30%)

== Gallery ==
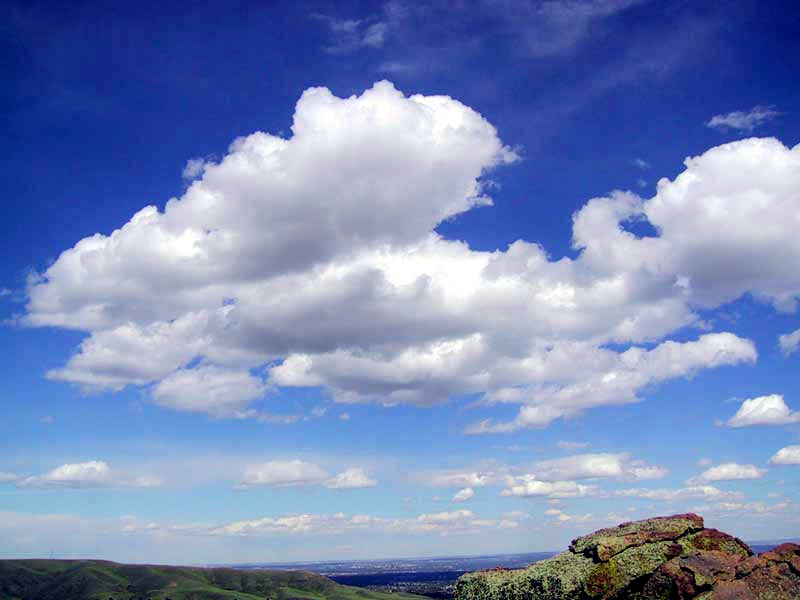
Seguwantivu and Vidatamunai Wind Farms
