= Nirmalapura Wind Farm =

Wind farm in Sri Lanka

- Country: Sri Lanka
- Location: Nirmalapura, Puttalam
- Coordinates: 07°57′53″N 79°44′07″E
- Status: Operational
- Commission date: October 2011
- Owner: WindForce (Pvt) Ltd
- Operators: Nirmalapura Wind Power (Pvt) Ltd

Wind farm
- Hub height: 75 m (246 ft)
- Rotor diameter: 77 m (253 ft)
- Feed-in tariff: 19.43 Sri Lankan rupee (per kilowatt-hour)

Power generation
- Units operational: 7 × 1.5 MW
- Make and model: RegenVensys 77
- Nameplate capacity: 10.5 MW

The Nirmalapura Wind Farm is a 10 MW wind farm consisting of seven wind turbines, located on the west coast of Nirmalapura, Puttalam, Sri Lanka. The plant is owned by Nirmalapura Wind Power (Private) Limited, and was commissioned in September 2011.

Transportation of the wind turbines were carried out by Agility Logistics, while construction of the turbine foundations were completed by the International Construction Consortium at a cost of Rs.150 million. The Ceylon Electricity Board pays the wind farm company a flat rate of Rs.19.43 per KWh over a 20-year period. The wind power company is a joint venture between Akbar Brothers, Debug Group, Hayleys, and Hirdaramani Group.

Turbine locations
Turbine	Coordinates
Turbine 1	07°57′53″N 79°44′07″E
Turbine 2	07°57′42″N 79°44′12″E
Turbine 3	07°57′28″N 79°44′18″E
Turbine 4	07°57′15″N 79°44′23″E
Turbine 5	07°56′50″N 79°44′32″E
Turbine 6	07°56′38″N 79°44′34″E
Turbine 7	07°56′23″N 79°44′39″E

== See also ==
- Electricity in Sri Lanka
- List of power stations in Sri Lanka
