= Taliesin Master Game =

Taliesin Master Game is a board game invented by Ronald William Astle and distributed in 1981 by Talforce Ltd.

The game was notable for being released in three versions:

• The Starter Game, which consisted of moving chess-like pieces on a circular board.

• The Master Game, which built on the Starter Game by adding an intricately designed three level playing area.

• The Executive version, which featured circular glass boards.

The game was sold in Harrods, Hamleys, John Menzies and also through advertisements in Mensa magazine.

Taliesin Master Game is played on 3 circular boards, one on top of the other. There are nine different types of player piece, in gold or silver, each with unique movement. The object of the game is to capture the opponent's Life Force piece.

The core of the 3 boards is a "black hole" and this is the means of transferring pieces between boards.
