= DAS Handling Limited =

Aviation services company in Uganda

Coordinates: 00°02′24″N 32°37′03″E

- Type: Service company
- Industry: Aviation
- Founded: 1996
- Headquarters: Entebbe, Uganda
- Number of locations: Entebbe International Airport
- Area served: Uganda
- Key people: Marc Deleu; Managing Director
- Services: Ground Handling; Cargo Services; Executive Aviation; Travel Services; Aircraft Maintenance; Aviation Training; Aviation Security
- Owner: Das Handling Limited
- Number of employees: 450 (2017)
- Website: www.dashandling.com

DAS Handling Limited, is an aviation services company in Uganda, based at Entebbe International Airport, (IATA: EBB, ICAO: HUEN), Uganda's largest civilian and military airport. It is the second-largest airport ground handling service company in Uganda, behind market leader Menzies Aviation Uganda. Other services offered include aircraft maintenance, cold facilities storage, office and warehouse rentals, aviation security and aviation training, among others.

== Overview ==
DAS Handling Limited is a ground services provider at Entebbe International Airport, Uganda's largest and busiest civilian and military airport, behind market leader, Menzies Aviation Uganda. The company handles several international airlines including:

1. African Express Airways
2. Fastjet
3. Air Tanzania
4. Kenya Airways
5. Rwandair
6. Flysax
7. Precision Air
8. Jambojet
9. United Nations Missions (UNISFA, UNMISS, MONUSCO)

In addition to ground handling, DAS Aviation also provides cold storage for perishables, pharmaceuticals, fish, meat and meat products at its premises with the largest such facilities at Entebbe International Airport. The company has office space that it rents out to other companies operating at Entebbe International Airport as well as non aviation affiliated companies in addition to providing warehouse storage space.

It also undertakes a number of aviation related courses through its DAS Aviation School, which is both an IATA Accredited Training School and an Authorised Training Centre.

== History ==
The company was formed in 1996, as the self-handling ground unit for the aircraft group Dairo Air Services. In 2002, DAS Handling Limited was granted a renewable, five-year, commercial operator's license. This authorization allowed the company to compete for services to other airlines outside its parent group. In May 2014, the company attained ACC3/RA3 European Union ground handling certification. In August 2014, DAS Handling Limited successfully completed the International Air Transport Association (IATA) Safety Audit for Ground Operations (ISAGO). Following that successful audit, the company became one of 154 ground service providers worldwide who had successfully registered under the IATA ISAGO programme at that time.

The ISAGO accreditation was renewed several times after successful audits on the handler including the most recent one awarded in June 2023 that will run until 2025. On Wednesday 21 June 2023, DAS Handling Limited started Handling all flights affiliated to the United Nations Regional Service Centre Entebbe (RSCE) with missions including MONUSCO, UNISFA and UNMISS, among others. DAS will be dealing in both passenger and cargo flights including the World Food Program (WFP) as per the contract terms specified by UN Aviation.
