= Coleophora ogmotona =

Scientific classification
- Kingdom: Animalia
- Phylum: Arthropoda
- Class: Insecta
- Order: Lepidoptera
- Family: Coleophoridae
- Genus: Coleophora
- Species: C. ogmotona

Binomial name
- Coleophora ogmotona Meyrick, 1917

Species of moth

Coleophora ogmotona is a moth of the family Coleophoridae. It is found in Sri Lanka (western region, Puttalam) and south-western India (Dharwar plateau).

The wingspan is about 8 mm.
