= WindForce =

Sri Lankan renewable energy company

WindForce PLC
- Logo of WindForce PLC

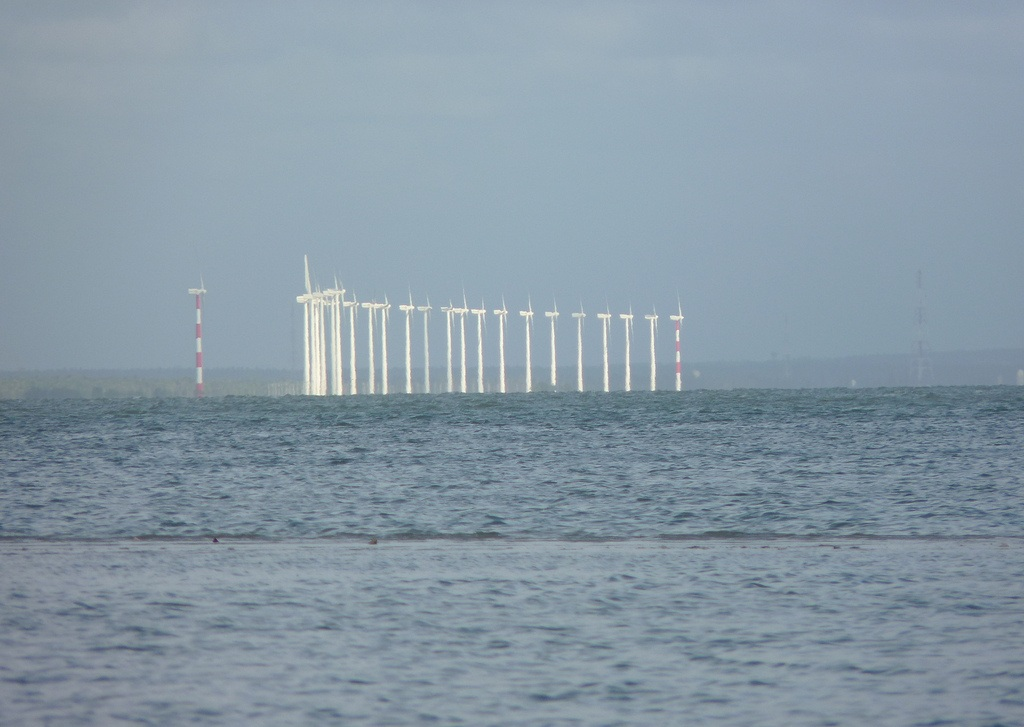
- Wind turbines of Seguwantivu Wind Farm
- Formerly: WindForce Limited
- Company type: Public
- Traded as: CSE: WIND.N0000
- ISIN: LK0461N00000
- Industry: Utility industry; Renewable energy
- Founded: 2010; 16 years ago
- Headquarters: Colombo, Sri Lanka
- Key people: Ranil Pathirana (Chairman); Manjula Perera (Managing Director)
- Revenue: ▲LKR4,953 million (2023)
- Operating income: ▲LKR3,018 million (2023)
- Net income: ▼LKR1,783 million (2023)
- Total assets: ▲LKR39,802 million (2023)
- Total equity: ▲LKR25,199 million (2023)
- Owners: Akbar Brothers Pvt Ltd. (36.48%); Hirdaramani Pvt Ltd. (20.67%)
- Number of employees: 155 (2023)
- Website: windforce.lk

WindForce PLC is the largest renewable energy private sector company in Sri Lanka. The company was incorporated in 2010 and in 2021 was listed on the Colombo Stock Exchange. The company commission, construct and operate power plants and generate power through wind, solar and hydropower.

== History ==
The company is incorporated in July 2010 and listed on the Colombo Stock Exchange in 2021.

=== IPO ===
In 2021, through an initial public offering (IPO), the company was planned to raise up to LKR3.2 billion by offering a stake of 15% in the company. With the capital raised through the IPO the company is planning to build a 15MW wind plant in Mannar, Sri Lanka and a 30MW solar plant with 7.5MW battery storage in Senegal. The company is expected to become the largest renewable energy company, exceeding the second-placed company by over five times. WindForce's IPO was the largest since in 2011 in the Colombo Stock Exchange. It attracted 1,654 applications amounting to LKR25.7 billion, oversubscribing by nearly eight times on the first day of the IPO.

=== Post-IPO trading ===
The company declared an interim dividend for the financial year 2021/22, which corresponds to a LKR0.75 dividend per share yielding a 4.75% return. WindForce acquired 33.3% of stake in Solar Universe (Pvt) Ltd, a solar power plant in Vavunathivu. Vidullanka PLC and HiEnergy Services (Pvt) Ltd are the other two stakeholders of the plant and will add 10MW to the National Grid annually. The company acquired a 500 tons per day waste to energy plant from Fairway Holdings, the company acquired 92.5 per cent of the stake. The plant is located in Karadiyana, 15km from Colombo. In June 2021, the company received the Cabinet approval to build the planned wind power plants in Mannar.

== Operations ==
The company is an independent power producer with an installed capacity of 218 megawatts. 77% of the effective capacity is based in Sri Lanka and the rest is based in Pakistan, Ukraine and Uganda. The company operates 27 power plants. Seven of the plants are wind power plants while 10 is solar plants and the other 10 are mini-hydropower plants. The company is planned to develop a solar power plant in Cameroon and is looking for opportunities in Bangladesh and Africa.

=== Wind farms ===
| Power station | Capacity (MW) | Location | Stake % |
|---|---|---|---|
| Beta Power | 10.0 | Kilinochchi | 66.40 |
| Daily Life | 10.0 | Puttalam | 95.83 |
| Joule Power | 10.0 | Kilinochchi | 66.40 |
| Nirmalapura | 10.0 | Puttalam | 49.00 |
| Powergen | 10.0 | Puttalam | 100 |
| Seguwantivu | 9.6 | Puttalam | 100 |
| Vidatamunai | 9.6 | Puttalam | 100 |
| Hiruras Power 10 MW | 10.0 | Mannar | 100 |
| Hiruras Power 5 MW | 5.0 | Mannar | 100 |

=== Solar farms ===
| Power station | Capacity (MW) | Location | Stake % |
|---|---|---|---|
| Harappa Solar | 18.0 | Harappa, Pakistan | 12.85 |
| Hirujanani | 2.1 | Roof tops in Sri Lanka | 66.00 |
| Gharo Solar | 50.0 | Gharo, Pakistan | 30.00 |
| Semypolky Solar | 10.6 | Brovarskiy, Ukraine | 12.50 |
| Seruwawila | 1.0 | Vavuniya | 90.00 |
| Solar One | 10.0 | Welikanda | 50.00 |
| Sunny Clime | 1.0 | Vavuniya | 90.00 |
| Suryadhanavi | 11.4 | Roof tops in Sri Lanka | 88.00 |
| Tororo PV Power | 10.0 | Tororo, Uganda | 80.00 |
| Vydexa | 10.0 | Vavuniya | 76.13 |

=== Hydroelectric power stations ===
| Power station | Capacity (MW) | Location | Stake % |
|---|---|---|---|
| Energy Reclamation | 0.8 | Sitagala | 100.00 |
| Gurugoda Hydro | 1.2 | Kegalle | 50.00 |
| H.P.D. Power | 3.2 | Dambulla | 100.00 |
| Mahoma Uganda | 2.7 | Mahoma, Uganda | 36.00 |
| Melanka Power | 3.8 | Haldummulla | 100.00 |
| Peak Power | 2.0 | Ginigathhena | 100.00 |
| Terraqua International | 1.3 | Halathura Ganga | 100.00 |
| Terraqua Kokawita | 1.2 | Kalawana | 100.00 |
| Vidul Madugeta | 2.5 | Neluwa | 50.00 |
| Ziba | 7.6 | Kyambura, Uganda | 25.50 |

Source: Annual Report 2020/21

== See also ==
- List of Sri Lankan public corporations by market capitalisation
