= Solar One Ceylon Power Station =

Solar power station in Welikanda, Sri Lanka

- Country: Sri Lanka
- Location: Welikanda
- Coordinates: 7°59′N 81°14′E
- Status: Operational
- Commission date: January 2017
- Owner: Akbar Brothers
- Operator: Solar One Ceylon

Solar farm
- Type: Standard PV
- Site area: 19.95 acres (8.07 ha)

Power generation
- Nameplate capacity: 12.56 MW
- Annual net output: 20,000 MW h

The Solar One Ceylon Power Station is a 12.56-megawatt solar photovoltaic farm built in January 2017 at Welikanda, in the Polonnaruwa District of Sri Lanka. The solar farm utilizes 315W and 320W polycrystalline modules manufactured by JA Solar Holdings, which are installed over 624 single-axis solar trackers supplied by the Spanish firm Grupo Clavijo. The trackers are expected to boost production up by 20%, compared to a fixed tilt setup.

Hayleys partly funded the project, which is developed and owned by WindForce (Private) Limited, a Sri Lankan company well-known for working closely with the government in the energy market. The facility took five months to build, and was ceremonially declared open by the Ministry of Power and Renewable Energy Ranjith Siyambalapitiya and deputy minister Ajith Perera. The solar farm is expected to produce approximately 20,000 MWh annually.

== See also ==
- List of power stations in Sri Lanka
