= Menzies Aviation Uganda =

Aviation services company in Uganda

Coordinates: 00°02′24″N 32°27′10″E

- Industry: Aviation Services
- Founded: 1996; 30 years ago
- Headquarters: Entebbe International Airport
- Number of locations: 1
- Key people: Kenneth Bainomugisha; Station Manager; Nouamane Zahouani; General Manager
- Services: Ground Handling, Cargo Services; Executive Aviation; Travel Services; Aircraft Maintenance; Courier Services; Training; Airport Security
- Number of employees: 810 (2018)
- Website: Homepage

Menzies Aviation Uganda (MAU), formerly National Aviation Services Uganda (NASU) and formerly Entebbe Handling Services (ENHAS), is an airport ground handling service company based in Uganda. It is the largest ground handling company at Entebbe International Airport (IATA: EBB, ICAO: HUEN), Uganda's largest civilian and military airport, where it serviced at least 19 airlines, as of November 2017. As of August 2023, MAU handled an estimated 80 percent of the cargo that went through Entebbe Airport.

== Location ==
MAU Uganda maintains its headquarters at Entebbe International Airport, Entebbe, Uganda. This location is approximately 50 kilometres (31 mi), by road, southwest of Kampala, the capital and largest city of Uganda. The coordinates of the headquarters of NAS Uganda are 0°02'24.0"N, 32°27'10.0"E (Latitude:0.040000; Longitude:32.452778).

== Overview ==
Menzies Uganda is the largest ground services provider at Entebbe International Airport, Uganda's largest and busiest civilian and military airport, where it competes with three other airport services companies. At Entebbe, the company services a number of passenger and cargo airlines, including the US Government.

In 2006, ENHAS was awarded a contract to service United Nations flights at 10 airports in the Democratic Republic of the Congo and at 10 airports in South Sudan.

In April 2021, National Aviation Services International (NAS) in collaboration with Congo Handling Services (CHS), launched a new ground handling operation, called NAS Democratic Republic of the Congo (NAS DRC), with handling contracts at Kinshasa International Airport, Lubumbashi International Airport and Goma International Airport. At the beginning NAS DRC services (a) Ethiopian Airlines (b) Kenya Airways (c) DHL Aviation (d) Compagnie Africaine d'Aviation and (e) Uganda Airlines. The new company was awarded a ground handling license by the DR Congolese authorities in November 2020.

== History ==
Menzies Aviation Uganda was formed in 1996 as ENHAS. Samuel Kutesa, at one time the Minister of Foreign Affairs of Uganda, was an investor in the company. In June 2014, he was elected president of the United Nations General Assembly. In a press conference in New York City, he informed the press that he had suspended his interests in all the businesses that he owned, including his shareholding in ENHAS. In December 2018, the Daily Monitor newspaper reported that Kutesa had divested from ENHAS by selling his stake in the company to a group of investors from the United Arab Emirates.

== Ownership ==
In 2017, ENHAS was acquired by Kuwaiti-based National Aviation Services (NAS). NAS is a large airport services provider, with operations in more than 30 airports across Africa, Asia and the Middle East. NAS also manages 31 airport lounges in 17 countries. In 2022 NAS rebranded as Menzies Aviation following a corporate merger.

== New equipment ==
In August 2023, the Daily Monitor reported that Menzies Aviation Uganda acquired new ground handling equipment that is environmentally friendly, valued at US$1 million. The equipment that is 100 percent electric does not use fossil fuel and comprises (a) a COBUS 3000 bus (b) a JBT Commander 30i high loader (c) two Caterpillar electric fork lifts and (d) two Caterpillar electric high reach stackers. MAU expects more new equipment in 2024.
