= Eason & Son =

Irish retail company

Eason Retail PLC
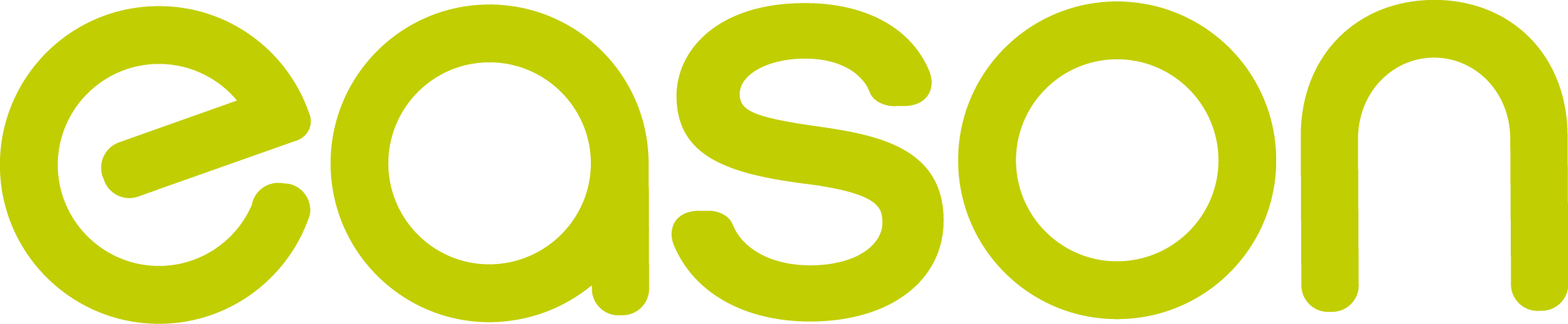

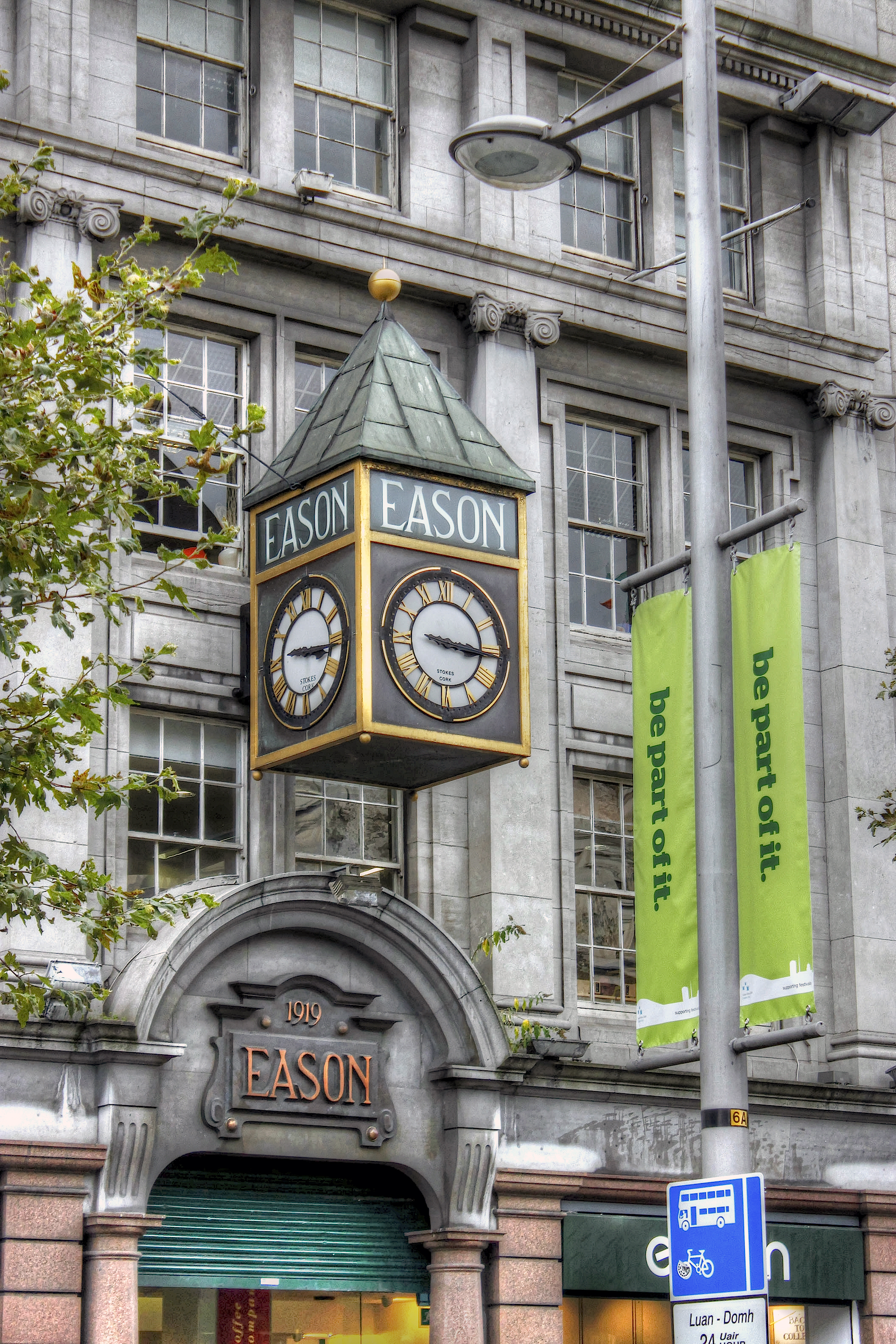
- Eason's on O'Connell Street, Dublin
- Type: Private
- Industry: Retail; Wholesale
- Founded: 1819
- Headquarters: Dublin, Ireland,
- Key people: Liam Hanly, Managing Director
- Products: Books; Stationery; Newspaper; Cards and gifts Toys
- Revenue: €104 million (2021)
- Website: www.easons.com

Eason Retail PLC, known as Easons or Eason, is an Irish retail company best known for selling books, stationery, cards, gifts, newspapers, and magazines. Headquartered in Swords, County Dublin, it is the largest supplier of books, magazines, and newspapers in Ireland.

Eason employs approximately 600 people and is privately owned. Its turnover for the year ended January 2022 was €104 million. 54 shops trade under the main Eason brand in Ireland. Eason also owns the Dubray Books brand and chain of 11 bookshops, having acquired it in February 2020. Eason's managing Director is Liam Hanly.

== Divisions ==
Eason operates three business units: Eason Stores, Eason Online, and Dubray.

=== Eason Stores ===
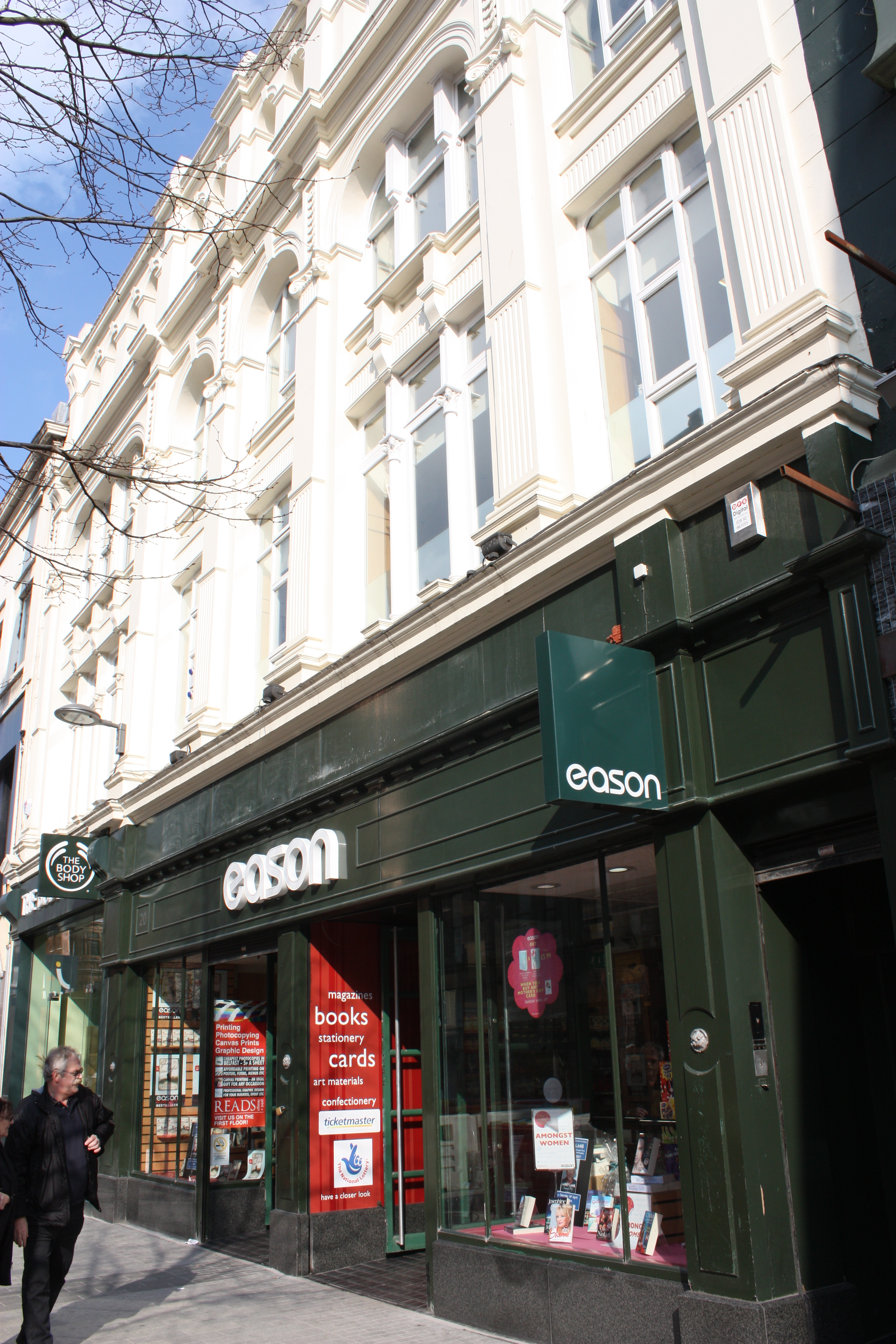
Former Eason & Son at Donegall Place, Belfast, in March 2011. This is now a Life Style Sports store.

54 shops trade under the Eason brand. This includes the company's flagship shop on Dublin's O’Connell Street as well as shops in Arklow, Athlone, Balbriggan, Ballincollig, Blanchardstown, Carlow, Cavan, Clare Hall, Clonmel Shopping Centre, Cork City (2), Crescent Shopping Centre (Limerick), Douglas, Dun Laoghaire, Dundalk, Dundrum, Dungarvan, Ennis, Enniscorthy, Galway Shop Street, Galway Shopping Centre, Gorey, Heuston Station, Jetland, Kilkenny, Killarney, Liffey Valley, Limerick, Listowel, Mahon, Mallow, Maynooth, Monaghan, Mullingar, Nassau Street, Navan, Newbridge, Parkway, Santry, Shannon, Sligo, Sligo Quayside, Stephen's Green, Swords, Tallaght, Thurles, Tralee, Wexford, and Wilton.

in 2019, Eason expanded its physical footprint by purchasing six shops in Kilkenny, Clonmel, Balbriggan, Maynooth, and Arklow which had previously been operated under franchise agreement. It also added three new franchise shops in Gorey, Enniscorthy and Wexford.

=== Eason Online ===
Eason's online business generated record revenues and high levels of profitability in 2021.

=== Dubray ===
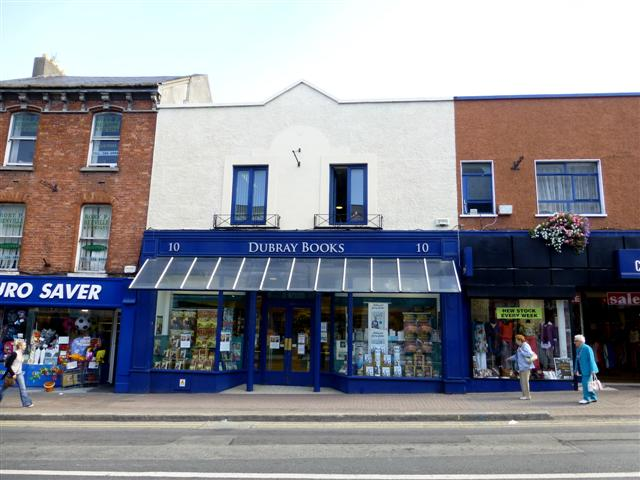
Dubray Books, Bray

Eason's acquired rival bookseller Dubray in 2020. Dubray was founded in 1973 with its first shop in Bray, and had eight shops at the time of its takeover by Eason's. Dubray's chain of bookshops and online business continue to operate under their separate brand, which specialises in book sales, as distinct from Eason's more general offering of books, newspapers, magazines, stationery, and other products. In 2022, Eason opened three new Dubray bookshops in Dundrum (Dublin), Cork, and on Dublin's Henry Street, bringing the total number of Dubray shops to 11. In September 2023, Dubray acquired Gutter Bookshop, including its two shops in Dublin City Centre and Dalkey.

== History ==
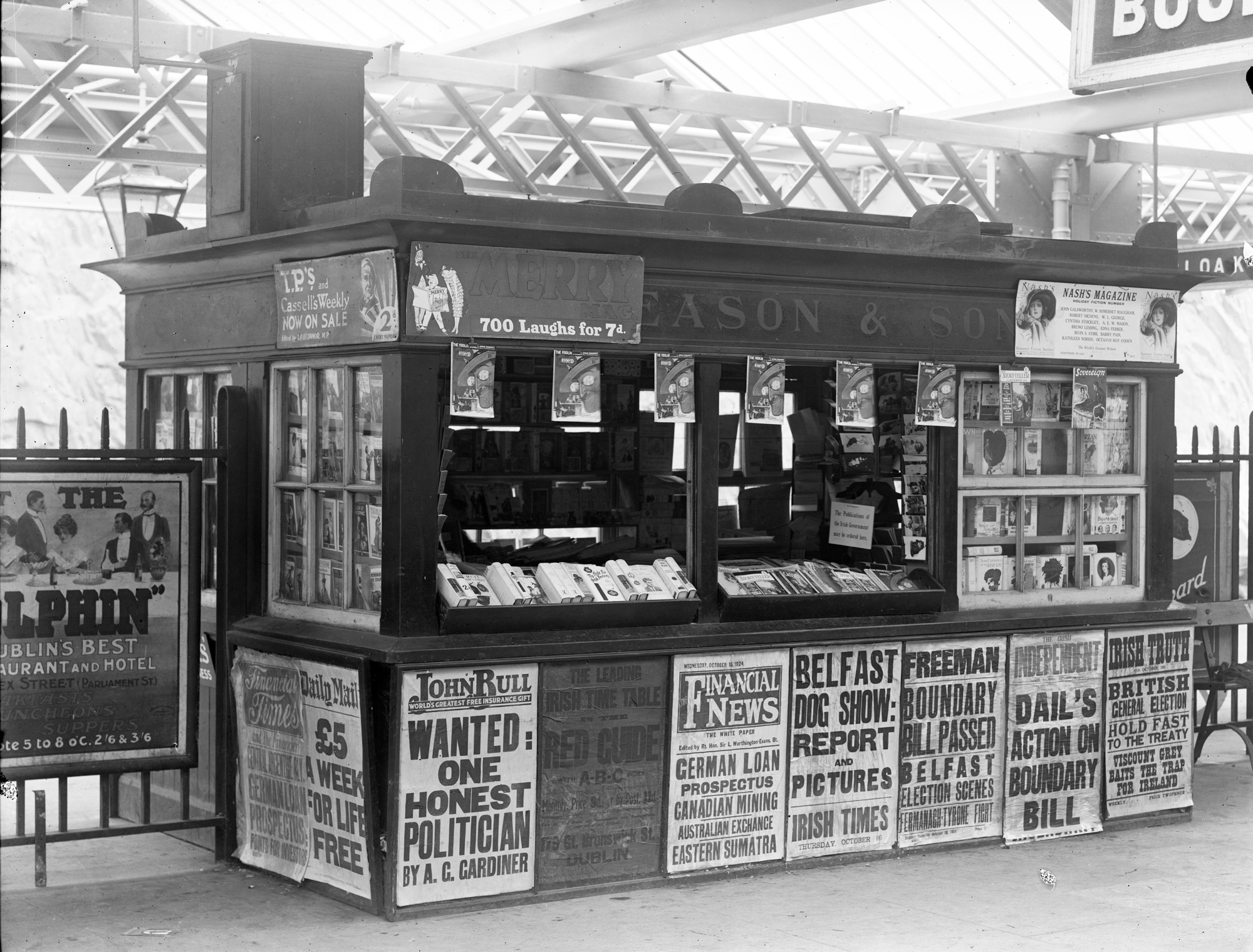
Eason & Son book stall at Waterford Railway Station, 1924

In 1886 Charles Eason, a manager of WHSmith wrote to the company asking if he could buy out the company. WHSmith sold its Irish section to him that year and there would not be a branch of WHSmith on any part of Ireland until 2001.

In 1913 James Larkin published a pamphlet warning the company not to stock the newspapers of William Martin Murphy during the 1913 lockout.

Originally all shops were owned and operated by Eason, but the chain began franchising with a number of new retail units operating independently under the Eason brand from the mid-2000s. In 2019, Eason acquired six of these shops and 17 of Eason shops are operated under a franchise agreement.

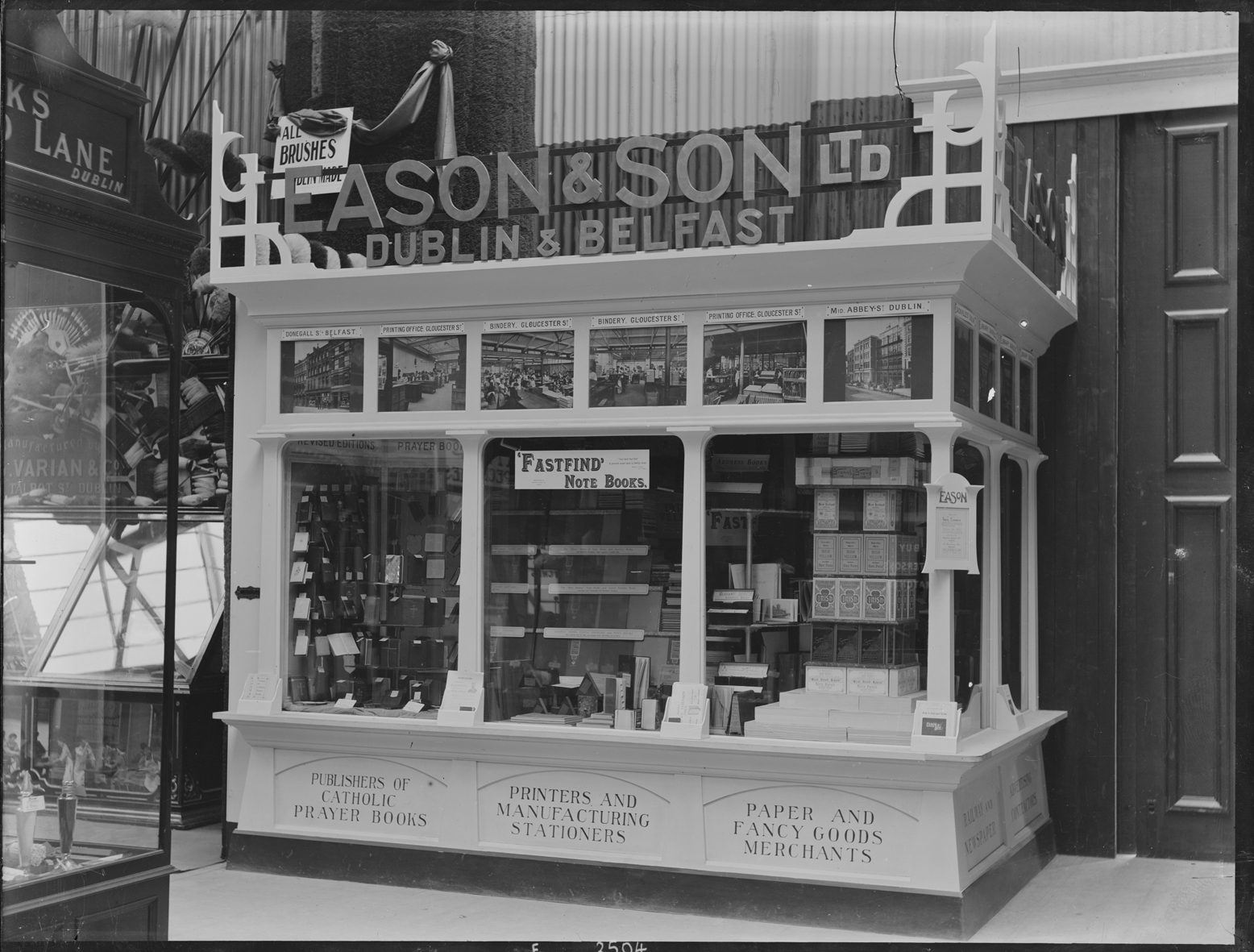

Shareholders voted to approve a sale and leaseback of the company's primarily owned shops in 2018 which created an independent retail business (Eason Retail PLC) and a separate entity holding shareholders’ property assets (Eason Holdings). Eason Holdings PLC entered voluntary liquidation in 2020 to facilitate a cash distribution to Eason shareholders from the proceeds of the sale of a number of properties since late 2018.

In 2020, Eason acquired rival bookseller Dubray Books; the Dubray units retained their brand and specialise in book sales, in contrast to the Eason-branded units' general offering of books, newspapers, magazines, stationery and other items.

On 23 March 2020, the company's seven shops in Northern Ireland temporarily closed in compliance with the government restrictions imposed as a result of the COVID-19 pandemic. On 15 July 2020, the company announced that, as a result of the pandemic, its Northern Irish shops would not reopen.

== Former divisions ==
- British Bookshops & Sussex Stationers outlets in south-east England. In May 2009, Eason sold this company to Endless PLC. Endless intends to keep the "British Bookshops" name.
- Eason's Advertising Services Limited - a niche advertising agency which closed in 2010.
- Eason and Son (N.I.) Ltd - This division operated a chain of 15 shops in Northern Ireland.
- N.P.O. UK Ltd. (subsequently rebranded Eason) - These shops were operated under Eason and Son (N.I.) Ltd. NPO UK specialised in stationery; however, after the Eason takeover, the shops stocked the same range of products as all Eason shops.
- Eason News Distribution Division (now merged into the EM News) - was based in Dublin and outside Cork City Newsbrothers. Newsbrothers, a subsidiary company of Eason, was responsible for newspaper and magazine distribution in the Munster region.
- Hughes & Hughes Airport - in early 2010 Hughes & Hughes entered administration, with Eason acquiring its seven airport shops, however Eason lost the tender to operate these bookshops in 2013.
- EM News Distribution - Eason merged its Irish newspaper and magazine wholesale distribution businesses with John Menzies creating EM News Distribution. Menzies Distribution purchased Eason's share in 2017.

== See also ==
- List of Irish companies
