= Menzies Aviation =

Scottish distribution and aviation business

John Menzies Ltd.
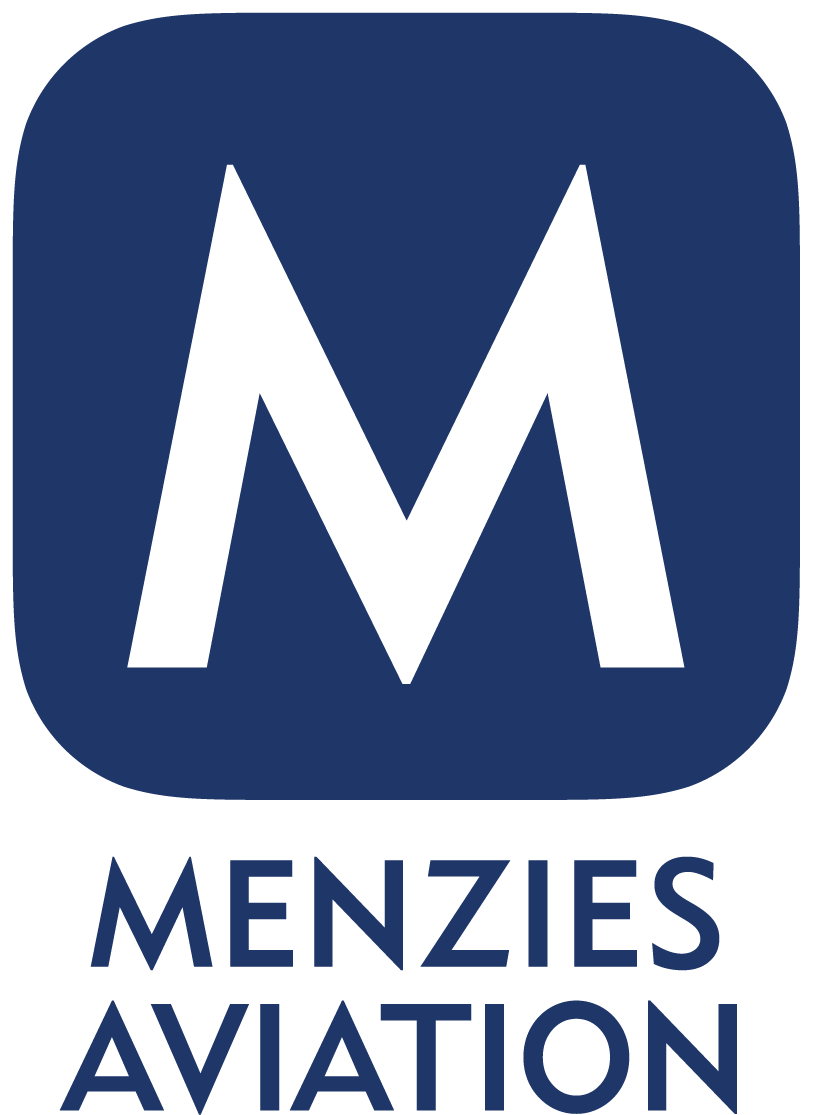
- Type: Subsidiary
- Industry: Aviation
- Founded: 1833; 193 years ago
- Founder: John Menzies
- Headquarters: London, United Kingdom
- Area served: Globally
- Key people: Hassan El-Houry (Chief Executive Officer)
- Services: Ground handling Air cargo handling Fuelling; Air freight forwarding Executive aviation
- Number of employees: Approximately 65,000 (2025)
- Parent: Agility Global
- Website: www.menziesaviation.com

Menzies Aviation is a British multinational aviation services company headquartered in London, England. It provides ground handling, cargo handling, fuelling and lounge services at airports worldwide. The company traces its origins to John Menzies, founded in Edinburgh in 1833, although its aviation services operations began in 1987. The company became a dedicated aviation services business in 2018 when it sold its distribution business. It was purchased by Agility Global in 2022 and combined with National Aviation Services under the Menzies Aviation brand.

== History ==
=== 1833–1986: Origins and early history ===
Former John Menzies logo

The company was founded by a bookseller, John Menzies, with his first shop at 61 Princes Street, Edinburgh, in 1833. (Note: Menzies died at his townhouse, 3 Grosvenor Crescent in Edinburgh's West End, and was buried in Warriston Cemetery, on the north side of the city.) In 1837, he became the Scottish agent for sales of The Pickwick Papers, the first published work of Charles Dickens. In 1841, he became the agent for the famous periodical Punch. He also sold The Scotsman daily newspaper over the counter. During the 1840s John Menzies had bookshops and newsagents across the United Kingdom, often located at railway stations. In 1941, the company's branch in Greenock was destroyed in the Greenock Blitz.

In 1948, John Menzies opened its first bookstall at Turnhouse Airport in Edinburgh. Menzies bookshops and newsagents spread across the United Kingdom, often located at railway stations. The company acquired other operators such as Wyman & Sons in 1959 and got listed on the London Stock Exchange in October 1962. Menzies had 90 wholesale warehouses, 350 railway bookstalls and 161 shops by 1965.

=== 1987–1999: Entry into aviation ===
The first move into what would become Menzies' core business began in 1987, with the acquisition of the Scan International Group and Cargosave handling companies. The company expanded its aviation presence through a series of acquisitions, beginning with freight forwarder Air Marketing International in 1993, which was established in 1976, and rebranded as Air Menzies International (AMI). In 1995, Menzies Aviation began operating at Heathrow Airport with the acquisition of Concorde Express Transport. The purchase moved Menzies away from traditional retailing into cargo handling.

In January 1998, the company closed its principal retail branch in Edinburgh, although the head office continued to occupy the building. The whole retail operation was sold to WHSmith in May 1998, to enable Menzies to concentrate on its distribution business. In 1998, Menzies formed a joint venture with Lufthansa. The venture focused on ground-handling which increased its aviation services.

=== 2000–2017: Global expansion ===
Following the acquisition of Ogden Aviation in 2000, Menzies Aviation entered the ground handling sector and expanded its international operations, in 2006, the company commenced cargo and ground handling services in Australia and the United States. Over the following years, Menzies expanded into new markets across North America, Europe, Asia-Pacific and the Middle East. In January 2007, the company merged its newspaper and magazine wholesale distribution businesses in Northern Ireland into a joint venture with Eason & Son, which became known as EM News Distribution; the company acquired the 50% it did not own in May 2017.

On 31 January 2017, Menzies Aviation completed the acquisition of specialist aircraft fueller Aircraft Services International (ASIG) from BBA Aviation for US$202m.

=== 2018–present: Aviation-focused business ===
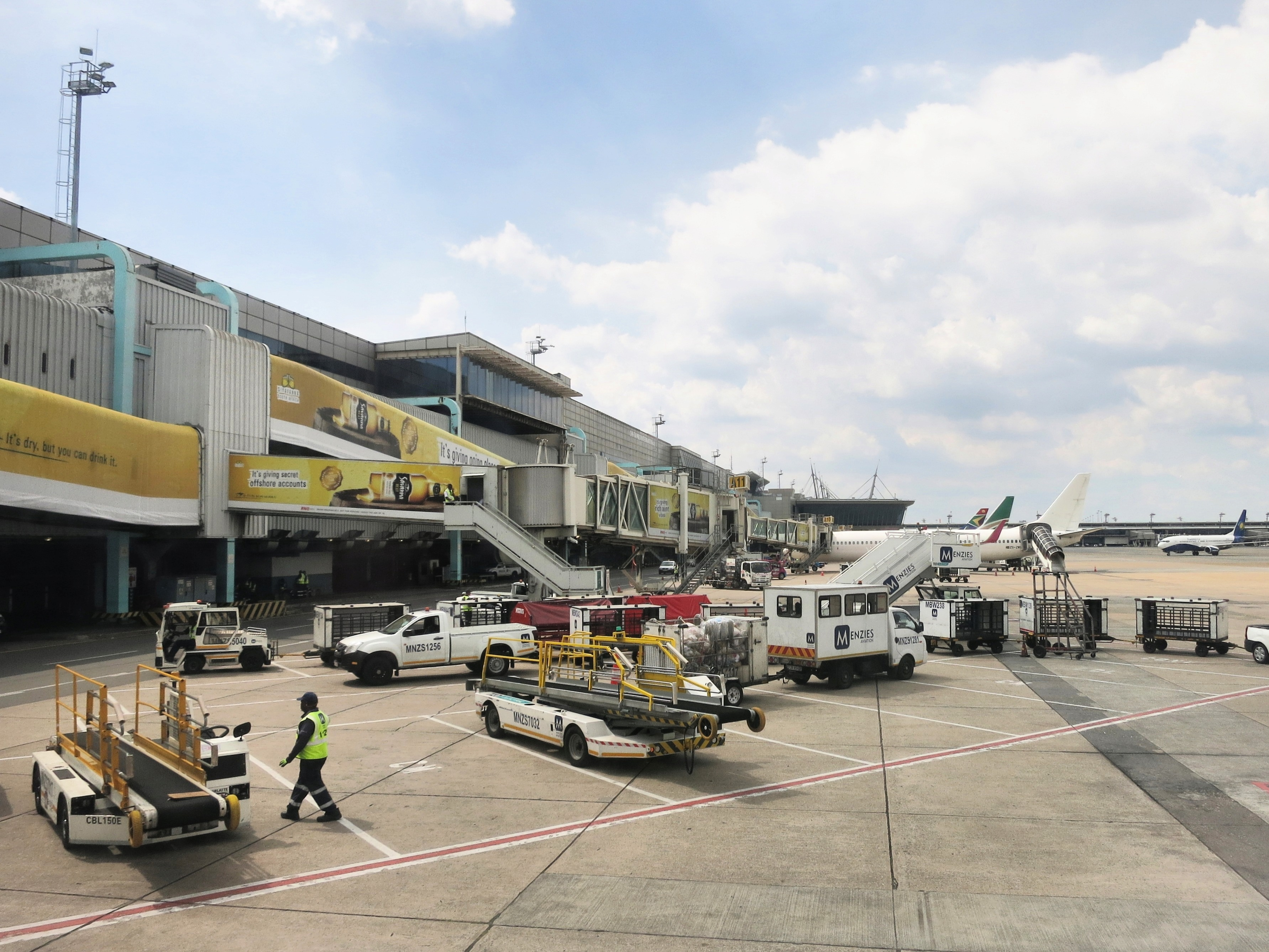
Ground handling equipment operated by Menzies Aviation at O. R. Tambo International Airport in South Africa during 2025

In 2018, Menzies sold its distribution division to private equity company Endless, one year after a proposed merger with DX Group. On 27 March 2020, the company confirmed it had been badly affected by the COVID-19 pandemic and reduced its headcount by over 17,500. The number of flights Menzies handled globally fell by 60% during the second quarter 2020.

In April 2022, Menzies Aviation acquired Santiago-based ground and air cargo handling services company, Agunsa Aviation Services. The same year, Agility Global acquired the company for £571 million stating it intended to merge its operations with its National Aviation Services subsidiary. The combined business continued to operate under the Menzies Aviation brand.

In February 2023, it was announced Menzies Aviation had acquired a majority stake in the Jamaican ground and cargo handling company, AJAS Limited. Menzies Aviation acquired in 2024 a 50% stake in Jardine Aviation Services Group in Hong Kong, resulting in the formation of Menzies CNAC Aviation Services, and obtained a 50.1% controlling interest in Groundforce Portugal (SpdH). It acquired the remaining 49.9% stake in SpdH from TAP Air Portugal in June 2026.

In 2025, the company announced the acquisition of G2 Secure Staff for US$305 million, expanding its operations in the United States and increasing its global presence to approximately 350 airports in 65 countries.
