= Panalpina =

Swiss logistics company

- Thumb
- Type: Private
- Industry: Transport
- Founded: 1935
- Defunct: 2021
- Headquarters: Copenhagen, Denmark
- Key people: Jens Bjørn Andersen, CEO
- Products: Freight forwarding services Logistic services
- Revenue: CHF8.172 billion (2016)
- Number of employees: 15,000 (2017)
- Website: www.dsv.com/en

Panalpina, legally Panalpina Welttransport Holding AG, was a Swiss logistics company. It merged with DSV in 2019 and became DSV Panalpina, with the Panalpina name being killed off in September 2021 by DSV through a brand re-alignment.

== History ==
Panalpina grew out of the Schweizerische Reederei AG (SR), founded in 1919, which tried to make better use of its Rhine fleet by buying into freight forwarding companies. It took stakes in, among others, Hans Im Obersteg & Co. (founded in 1895), which was also active in ocean shipping, in 1935, Marchesi Lombarda S.p.A. in Milan in 1938, Comptons Ltd. in London in 1939, Rohner, Gehrig & Co. Inc. in New York (founded in 1923) in 1947, and a Vienna branch of the same name in 1948. In 1954 SR grouped its forwarding holdings in the subsidiary Alpina International Transport AG in Basel, which it renamed Panalpina in 1960. The companies involved gradually took on this name. New companies were founded and others acquired, for example in Nigeria (oil business) and later in Asia and Latin America. Panalpina entered the air freight business in 1961. From 1973 its subsidiary Air Sea Broker (ASB) handled the bulk purchase of transport capacity. A joint venture with Swissair, SwissGlobalCargo, lasted only from 1999 to 2001.

In 1969 the Ernst Göhner Foundation took over 40% of Panalpina's share capital, and in 1971 the Dutch company Nedlloyd another 40%. In 1981 the remaining 20% also went to the Ernst Göhner Foundation, which later acquired further shares and was for a time the sole owner.

=== 21st Century ===
At the beginning of the 21st century, Panalpina's core business was air and sea freight and logistics services. In 2007 Panalpina Welttransport (Holding) AG had more than 15,000 employees in over 500 branches of its own in 160 countries.

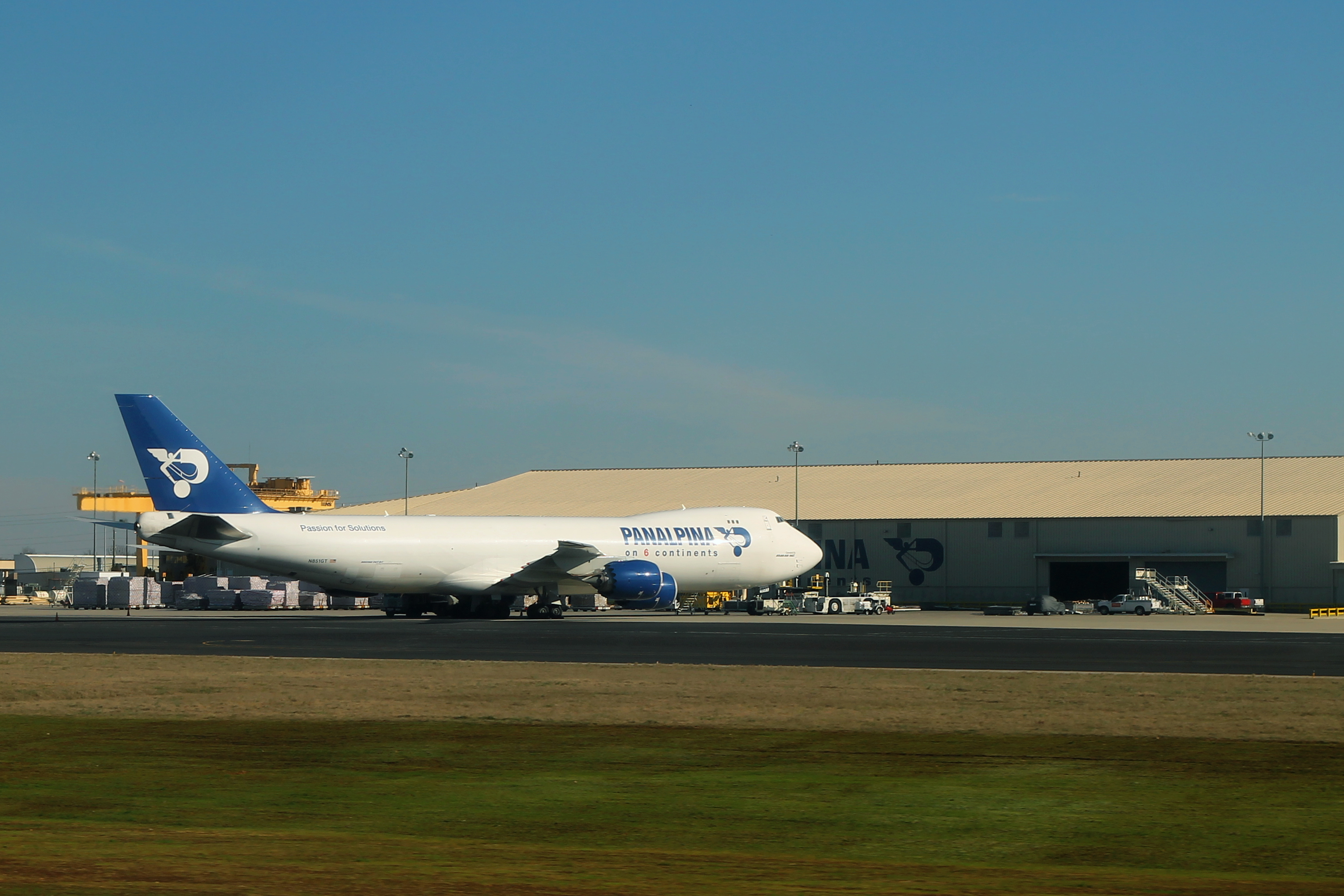
Panalpina's Boeing 747-8F parked at the cargo hangar of Huntsville International Airport.

Panalpina provided freight forwarding and logistics services, intercontinental air and ocean freight and associated supply chain management. It employed 15,000 people worldwide with hubs in Luxembourg, at Findel Airport, Prague and in Huntsville, Alabama, at Huntsville International Airport. The aircraft fleet composed of one Boeing 747-8F. Panalpina offers services to various industry verticals such as Hi-Tech, Automotive, Telecom, Retail&Fashion, Healthcare as well as Oil and Gas. Panalpina had wet leased or ACMI (aircraft, complete crew, maintenance, and insurance) agreements with cargo airline Atlas Air Cargo, naming one Boeing 747 the "Spirit of Panalpina". This arrangement ceased in July 2020 with the loss of around 88 jobs.

Panalpina was fully owned by the Ernst Göhner Foundation until its public listing on the SWX Swiss Exchange on 22 September 2005. In 2005, Panalpina acquired Janco Oilfield Services in Singapore and Overseas Shipping Group in Norway.

In 2010, Panalpina agreed to resolve foreign bribery investigations and to pay more than $80 million in penalties. The U.S. Department of Justice and the Securities and Exchange Commission investigated whether the company had paid foreign officials to speed drilling rigs and other equipment through customs.

In 2017, the company acquired two companies in Germany and the Netherlands, respectively, to extend its network in the perishables business. In 2019, after wide speculations circled around a possible merger of competitor DSV A/S and Panalpina, an agreement was announced on April 1, 2019 valued at CHF 4.6 billion (€ 4.1 billion). In effect Panalpina has been taken over by DSV (contrary to the "joining forces" statement) with the transaction completing in August 2019. The Panalpina C-Level has been entirely replaced, with former CEO Stefan Karlen ending a 21-year association with the old Panalpina business. At DSV's extraordinary general meeting on 24 September 2019, the shareholders voted to change the name of DSV A/S to DSV Panalpina A/S.

As part of the restructuring, DSV has decommissioned some old Panalpina IT systems (such as SAP TM in favour of CargoWise), resulting in job cuts across the new organisation. This also extended to relocating the head office to Copenhagen, effectively ending the tenure of Basel as the main company headquarters.

The Panalpina logo placed on the roof of the head office in Viaduktstrasse, Basel was taken down in May 2020.

On 8th September 2021, DSV announced that 'with the purchase of Agility’s Global Integrated Logistics business, “DSV will undergo its most significant change of the business since the acquisition of Panalpina in 2019. With this change, the timing is right to change the name of the parent entity back to DSV A/S and secure brand consistency across all markets and operations”.' This statement effectively ensured that the Panalpina name was killed off.
