= Seguwantivu and Vidatamunai Wind Farms =

Two wind farms in Puttalam, Sri Lanka

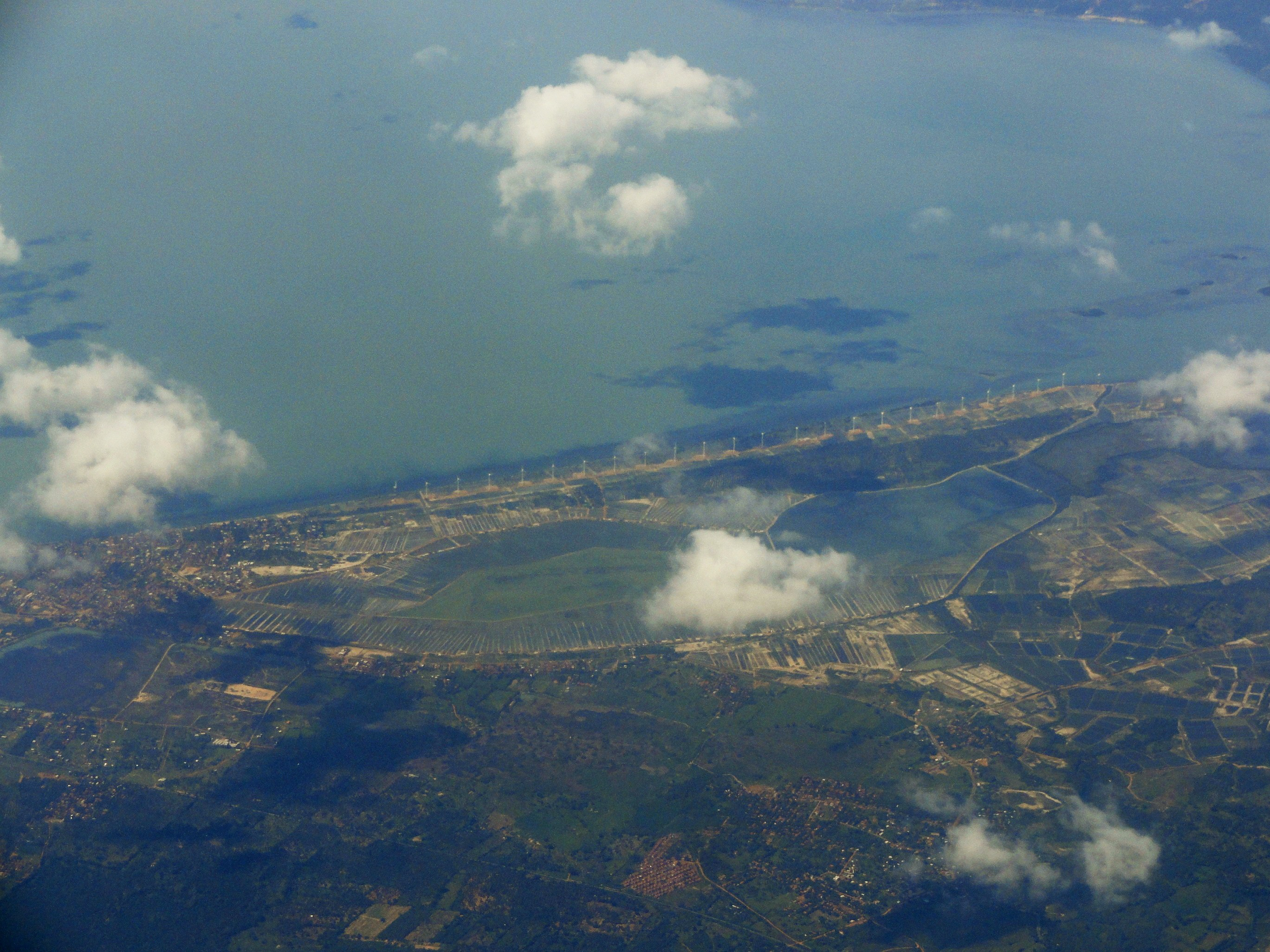
- Aerial view of all twenty-five wind turbines of the Seguwantivu and Vidatamunai wind farms.
- Location in Sri Lanka
- Country: Sri Lanka
- Location: Puttalam
- Coordinates: 08°03′18″N 79°48′23″E
- Status: Operational
- Construction began: August 2009
- Commission date: June 2010
- Construction cost: US$40 million
- Owner: WindForce (Pvt) Ltd
- Operators: Seguwantivu Wind Power (Pvt) Ltd; Vidatamunai Wind Power (Pvt) Ltd

Wind farm
- Type: Onshore
- Hub height: 60 m (197 ft)

Power generation
- Units operational: 25 × 800KW
- Make and model: Gamesa Corporación Tecnológica: Gamesa AE-59
- Nameplate capacity: 20 MW
- Annual net output: 52.56 GWh

External links
- Commons: Related media on Commons

The Seguwantivu and Vidatamunai Wind Farms are two legally separate wind farms built together by Seguwantivu Wind Power and Vidatamunai Wind Power, on the south-east shore of the Puttalam Lagoon, in Puttalam, Sri Lanka.

The Seguwantivu Wind Farm utilizes thirteen 800-kilowatt Gamesa AE-59 wind turbines, while the Vidatamunai Wind Farm utilizes twelve wind turbines also of the same model, thus totalling the installed capacity to 9.6MW and 10.4MW respectively. The wind farm is approximately 3.2 km (2.0 mi) in length, and is diagonal from north-west to south-east, with the mainland on the north-east the Puttalam Lagoon on the south-west. The twelve northern turbines belong to Vidatamunai Wind Farm, while the thirteen southern turbines belong to Seguwantivu. The wind farms cost US$40 million to construct.

The transportation of wind turbines from the Colombo Harbour to the wind farm site was carried out by Agility Logistics in late-2009. Power lines and telephone poles had to be permanently raised to 19 ft (5.8 m) in order to accommodate the transportation of large turbine parts from the Harbour to the construction site. The erection of each turbine required three cranes; a 230 metric ton lattice crane with a 110 m (361 ft) boom, a 60 metric ton crane, and a 10 metric ton crane, all of which were imported. The wind farms together produces 52.56 GWh of electricity annually. A central control station, two indoor switch yards of 10MW each, 1kV/33kV transformers, and an administration building has been built in the Mullipuram Village to support the operations of the wind farm.

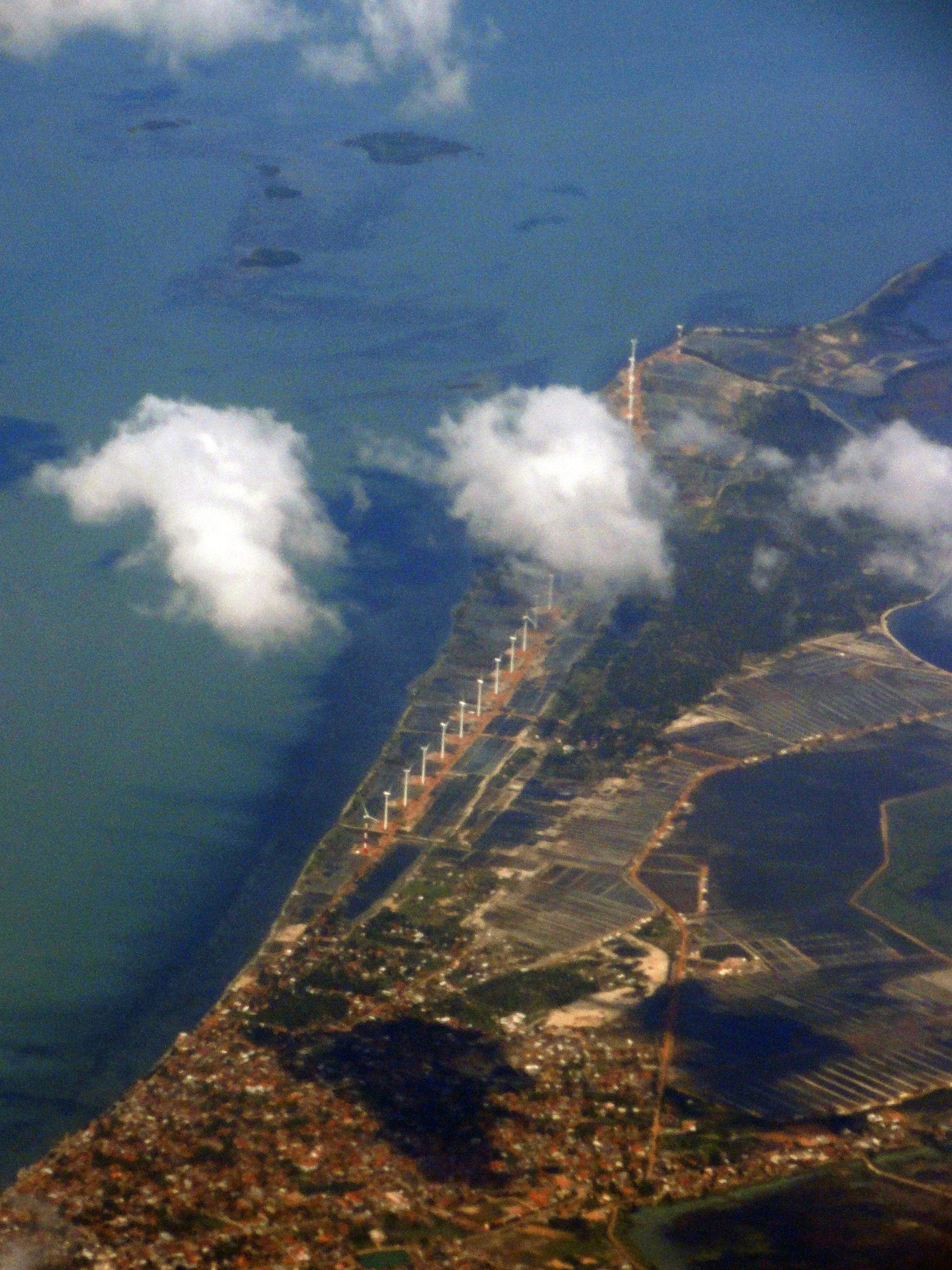
Aerial view of eighteen of the twenty-five turbines. Seven turbines in the series are obscured by clouds.

== See also ==
- Electricity in Sri Lanka
- List of power stations in Sri Lanka
