= Abdul Baiz Kamardeen =

Sri Lankan politician (1969–2021)

Hon. Abdul Baiz Kamardeen
- கே. ஏ. பாயிஸ் කේ.ඒ. බායිස්

Deputy Minister of Provincial Councils
- In office 2007–2010

Member of Parliament for National List
- In office 2004–2010

Personal details
- Born: 20 February 1969 Puttalam
- Died: 23 May 2021 (aged 52) Puttalam
- Party: Sri Lanka Muslim Congress
- Other political affiliations: United People's Freedom Alliance
- Children: 4
- Education: Zahira College Puttalam
- Occupation: Politics

Kamardeen Abdul Baiz (20 February 1969 – 23 May 2021) was Chairman of Urban Council Puttalam (In office 2018 to until death), a Sri Lankan former parliamentarian and cabinet deputy minister. He was a national organizer of the Sri Lanka Muslim Congress (SLMC) Party, a registered political party in Sri Lanka during M. H. M. Ashraff Leadership. Baiz was a Member of Parliament (MP) from the Puttalam Electoral District in April 2004. He was the mayor of the Puttalam Urban Council when he was met with an accident. He died on 23 May 2021 following a road accident. It is reported that the accident had taken place in the Eluwamkulama area while he was returning to his Puttalam residence after visiting a private land belonging to the mayor in the Ralmaduwa area in Wanathavilluwa.
