= DSV (company) =

Danish transport and logistics company

DSV A/S
- Type: Aktieselskab
- Traded as: Nasdaq Copenhagen: DSV; OMX Copenhagen 25 component
- Industry: Transport; Logistics
- Founded: 1976; 50 years ago
- Headquarters: Hedehusene, Denmark
- Key people: Jens H. Lund (Group CEO)
- Services: Freight forwarding, Air, Sea and Road transport, Contract logistics
- Revenue: DKK 247,331 million (2025)
- Operating income: DKK 19,611 million (2025)
- Net income: DKK 8,172 million (total profit after tax, 2025)
- Total assets: DKK 290,373 million (2025)
- Total equity: DKK 117,690 million (2025)
- Number of employees: 151,751 (FTE, 31 December 2025)
- Divisions: Air & Sea, Road, Contract Logistics
- Subsidiaries: Schenker; DSV Solutions
- Website: www.dsv.com

DSV A/S is a Danish transport and logistics company offering global transport services by road, air, sea and train. Since its foundation in 1976 by nine independent Danish hauliers, the company expanded predominantly through a series of competitor acquisitions.

The headquarters is located in Hedehusene (near Copenhagen), Denmark. There are offices in more than 80 countries, employing around 74,000 people, including temporary workers. The company is listed on NASDAQ OMX Copenhagen (Copenhagen Stock Exchange) and included in the OMXC25 index as one of the 25 most traded stocks.

The company is structured in three divisions, Air & Sea, Road, and Contract Logistics. Its main activities lie within road transport (trucking) networks in Europe, North America and South Africa, global air and sea freight forwarding business, and contract logistics across the globe. As part of an asset-light financial strategy, the group does not own any ships or aeroplanes and only a relatively small fleet of trucks and trailers.

Jens Lund became CEO in February 2024. In 2022, the company reported a net revenue of DKK 235,665 million.

== History ==
In 1976, Leif Tullberg and nine independent haulers established DSV, an initialism for "De Sammensluttede Vognmænd af 13-7 1976 A/S" (The Joint Hauliers of 13-7 1976). Leif Tullberg remained CEO until his retirement in 2005.

He was succeeded by Kurt Larsen who became chairman of the board of directors in 2008 when Jens Bjørn Andersen took over as CEO.

During the first decade the company mainly functioned as a cartage department for the owners, handling contract haulage and deliveries.

Seeking to enter the international market, DSV bought two competing export companies in 1989, Borup Autotransport A/S and Hammerbro A/S-Bech Trans, followed by buying Samson Transport Co. A/S in 1997 and Svex Group A/S in 1999.

The purchase of the DFDS Dan Transport Group in 2000 provided DSV with road transport activities in Scandinavia, the UK, several Mainland European countries and the Baltics and a global network including a logistics set-up. The purchase of J.H. Bachmann in 2005 reinforced the company's position within international air and sea transport.

The acquisition of the Dutch Frans Maas Group in 2006 placed DSV as a Pan-European road transport and logistics supplier and one of the three largest in Europe. With the acquisition of ABX LOGISTICS in 2008, DSV entered the South American market.

With the acquisition of UTi Worldwide, Inc. in 2016 and Panalpina Welttransport (Holding) AG in 2019, the company became one of the world's four largest transport and logistics companies.

On 1 April 2019, an acquisition agreement with Swiss Panalpina was announced valued at CHF 4.6 billion (€ 4.1 billion). On 19 August 2019, DSV announced that the acquisition of Panalpina was completed.

In July 2020, DSV announced its plans to invest approximately DKK 2 billion in a new logistics centre near Horsens, Europe's largest with just one leaseholder.

In December 2020, DSV announced they would acquire Globeflight Worldwide Express, a South African-based courier company. The deal was completed in May 2021.

On 27 April 2021, DSV agreed terms to acquire Agility Logistics. The acquisition was completed 19 August 2021.

In September 2024, DSV agreed terms to purchase DB Schenker from Deutsche Bahn for €14.3 billion. On completion of the acquisition, the combined company will become the largest freight-forwarder in the world. The acquisition was finalized April 30, 2025.

== Company name ==
When in 2000 DSV A/S acquired DFDS Dan Transport Group A/S, the new joint company's activities continued under the DFDS Transport name, while the parent company remained De Sammensluttede Vognmænd (In English: The joint Hauliers) af 13-7 1976 A/S. In 2003, it was formally shortened to DSV A/S.

In 2007, the name of the company's transport activities were also changed to DSV.

On 24 September 2019, at an Extraordinary General Meeting following the acquisition of Panalpina Welttransport (Holding) AG, it was decided to change the company name from DSV A/S to DSV Panalpina A/S while maintaining DSV A/S as a second name. The name change only applied to the parent company.

On 8 September 2021, the name of parent company, DSV Panalpina A/S, was changed back to DSV A/S.
