= Pollupalai and Vallimunai Wind Farms =

Wind farms in Sri Lanka

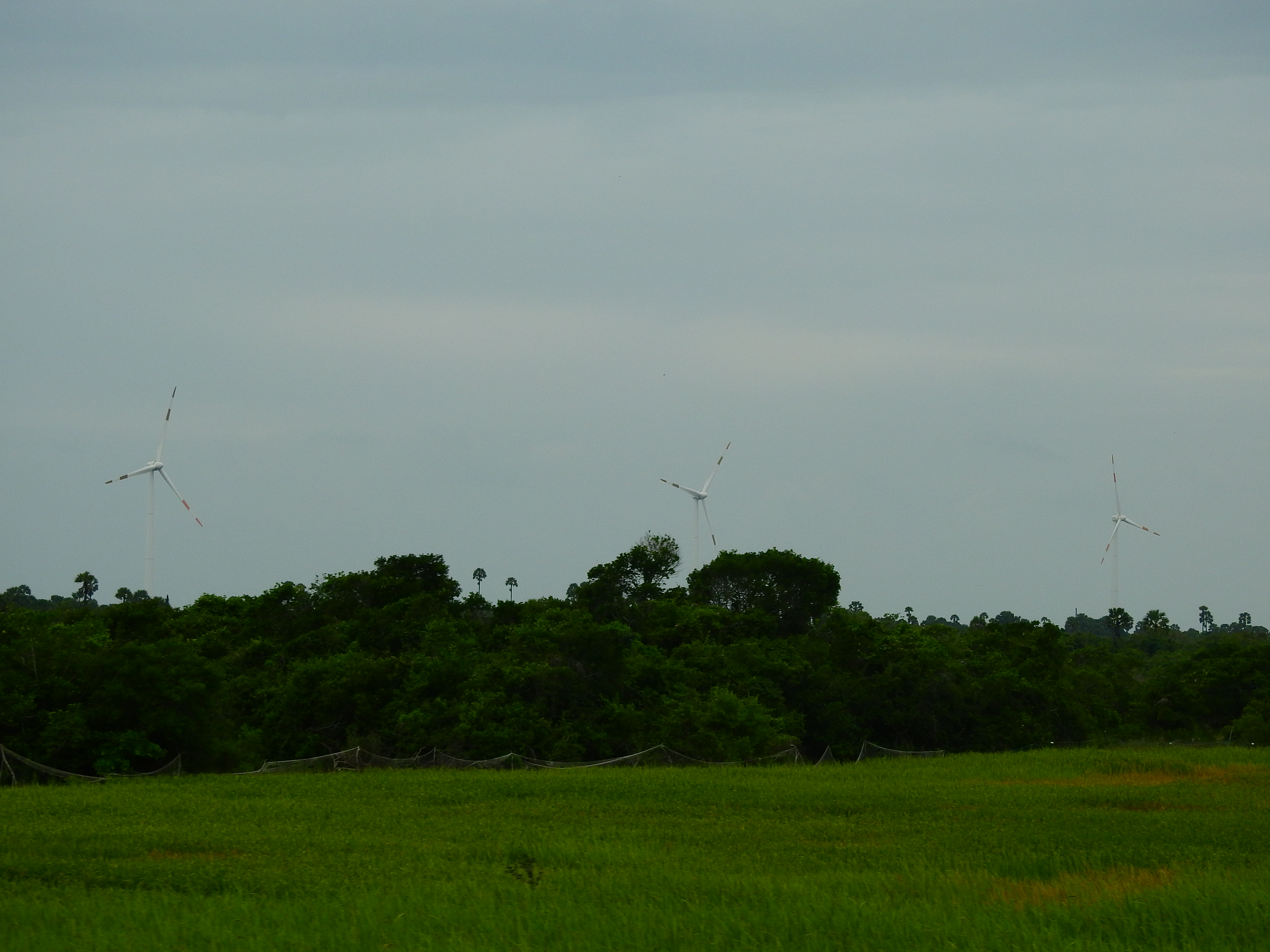
- Country: Sri Lanka
- Location: Pachchilaipalli
- Coordinates: 09°34′40″N 80°19′12″E
- Status: Operational
- Commission date: December 2014
- Owner: WindForce (Pvt) Ltd
- Operators: Joule Power (Pvt) Ltd; Beta Power (Pvt) Ltd

Wind farm
- Type: Onshore
- Hub height: 85 m (279 ft)
- Rotor diameter: 82 m (269 ft)
- Rated wind speed: 7.5 m/s (25 ft/s)
- Site elevation: Sea level

Power generation
- Units operational: 16 × 1.5 MW
- Make and model: ReGen V82
- Nameplate capacity: 24 MW
- Annual net output: 60 GWh

External links
- Website: www.windforce.lk
- Commons: Related media on Commons

The Pollupalai and Vallimunai Wind Farms are two wind farms built together by Joule Power and Beta Power, on the north-eastern shore of the Jaffna Lagoon, in Pachchilaipalli, Sri Lanka. Both wind farms are owned by the parent company WindForce, and have an installed capacity of 12 megawatts each, and an annual production of approximately 60 GWh. The wind farms are the first-ever to be constructed in the Northern Province of Sri Lanka.

== Wind turbines ==
Both wind farms utilizes a total of sixteen ReGen V82 wind turbines, which has an installed capacity of 1.5 MW per turbine. The turbines operate at 9–17.3 RPM, and has a rotor diameter of 82 m (269 ft) and a swept area of 5,325 m^{2} (57,318 sq ft). The tubular tower section has a hub height of 85 m (279 ft), and is made up of four sections.

The wind turbine's operating wind speed is 12.5 m/s (41 ft/s), with cut-in and cut-out wind speeds of 3 m/s (9.8 ft/s) and 22 m/s (72 ft/s) respectively. The turbines can survive wind speeds of up to 52.5 m/s (172 ft/s). All 16 turbines are placed 400 m (1,300 ft) apart in a single row, facing the lagoon. The site's average wind speed is 7.5 m/s (25 ft/s), with an air density of 1.18 kg/m^{3} (0.074 lb/cu ft).

== See also ==
- Electricity in Sri Lanka
