= National Aviation Services =

Kuwaiti aviation services provider

National Aviation Services (NAS)
- Company type: Private
- Industry: Aviation
- Founded: 2003
- Headquarters: Kuwait City, Kuwait
- Number of locations: 55 airports
- Key people: Hassan El- Houry CEO
- Services: Ground Handling; Cargo Services; Airport lounge management Ramp Services
- Number of employees: 8000+ (2021)
- Website: nas.aero

National Aviation Services (NAS) is an aviation services provider headquartered in Kuwait City, Kuwait. The company currently operates at 55 airports through emerging markets countries across Africa, Asia and the Middle East.

== Background ==
NAS was founded in 2003, starting with one airline customer at Kuwait International Airport. As of 2006, NAS began its first operations outside of Kuwait in Aqaba, before starting its operations in India and Sudan in 2010, Ivory Coast in 2015 and Morocco in 2016. In 2008, NAS received IATA Safety Audit for Ground Operations (ISAGO).

In 2017, NAS acquired Entebbe Handling Services (ENHAS) and rebranded it to National Aviation Services Uganda. In the same year, NAS started operations in Liberia followed by DRC, Iraq, Italy and Guinea Bissau in 2020.

April 2021, NAS entered into an agreement with Bidvest Group Limited to acquire BidAir Services for an undisclosed amount and completed the deal in June 2021.

In October 2021, NAS acquired 51% equity interest in Siginon Aviation an aviation cargo management and ground handling, and a subsidiary of Siginon Group of Kenya for $40 million as a result, NAS took over management in Siginon Aviation.
