= EM News Distribution =

- Company type: Private
- Industry: News Distribution
- Founded: 2007
- Headquarters: Belfast, Northern Ireland and Dublin, Republic of Ireland
- Website: www.emnewsdistribution.com

EM News Distribution is a magazine and newspaper distributor which operates in Northern Ireland and the Republic of Ireland. The company is fully owned by Menzies Distribution.

The company was formed in 2007 by the merger of the Menzies Distribution and Eason News Distribution distribution business. In May 2017, Menzies Distribution acquired the 50% stake that was owned by Eason News Distribution.

Menzies Distribution delivers over 4.5 million newspapers and 2.5 million magazines daily to 30,000 customers. Eason, while on a smaller scale have equal experience delivering news titles to thousands of customers throughout Ireland. According to Menzies, the new company will have estimated gross assets of €10million.

Menzies Distribution has ceased trading in Northern Ireland (due to the joint venture) but continues to operate in Great Britain. Eason News Distribution as well as its subsidiary Newsbrothers (based in Cork) have stopped trading throughout Ireland.

EM News Distribution is based in Belfast Harbour Estate. Eason News distribution was based on the Boucher Road in Belfast. The forming of the company has made the Eason head office nearly defunct as Eason News distribution was its largest division operating from Belfast. This has led to many job losses.

== 2015 financial accounts ==
The company reported turnover of €95 million in 2015, as against €96.7 million a year earlier. Pre-tax profits declined from €1.15 million to €532,000, a figure which includes a loss on financial instruments of €489,000. "The commercial environment in which the company operates is expected to remain competitive in the year ahead," the directors said. "The business is subject to external consumer trends and demands. This is evident in the continued slow decline in national newspaper and magazine volumes."
