= Puttalam Divisional Secretariat =

- Divisional Secretariat
- Interactive map of Puttalam Divisional Secretariat
- Country: Sri Lanka
- Province: North Western Province
- District: Puttalam District
- Time zone: UTC+5:30 (Sri Lanka Standard Time)

Puttalam Divisional Secretariat is a Divisional Secretariat of Puttalam District, of North Western Province, Sri Lanka.

== Demography-Religion ==
Religion in Puttalam DS Division (2012)
1. Buddhist (18.2%)
2. Hindu (5.90%)
3. Muslim (64.2%)
4. Roman Catholic (10.1%)
5. Other Christian (1.60%)
6. Other (0.00%)

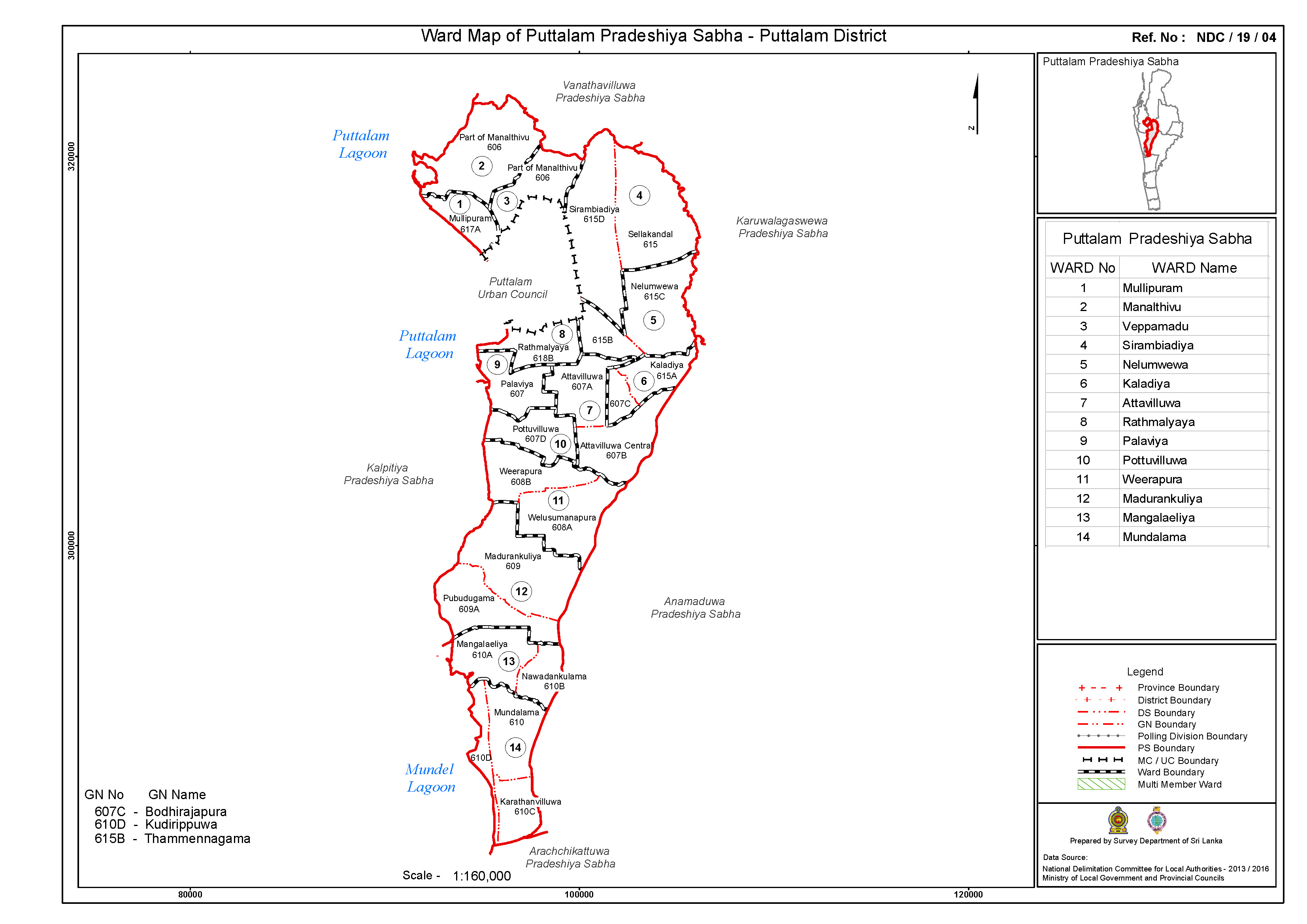
Ward Map of Puttalam Prepared by Survey Department of Sri Lanka.

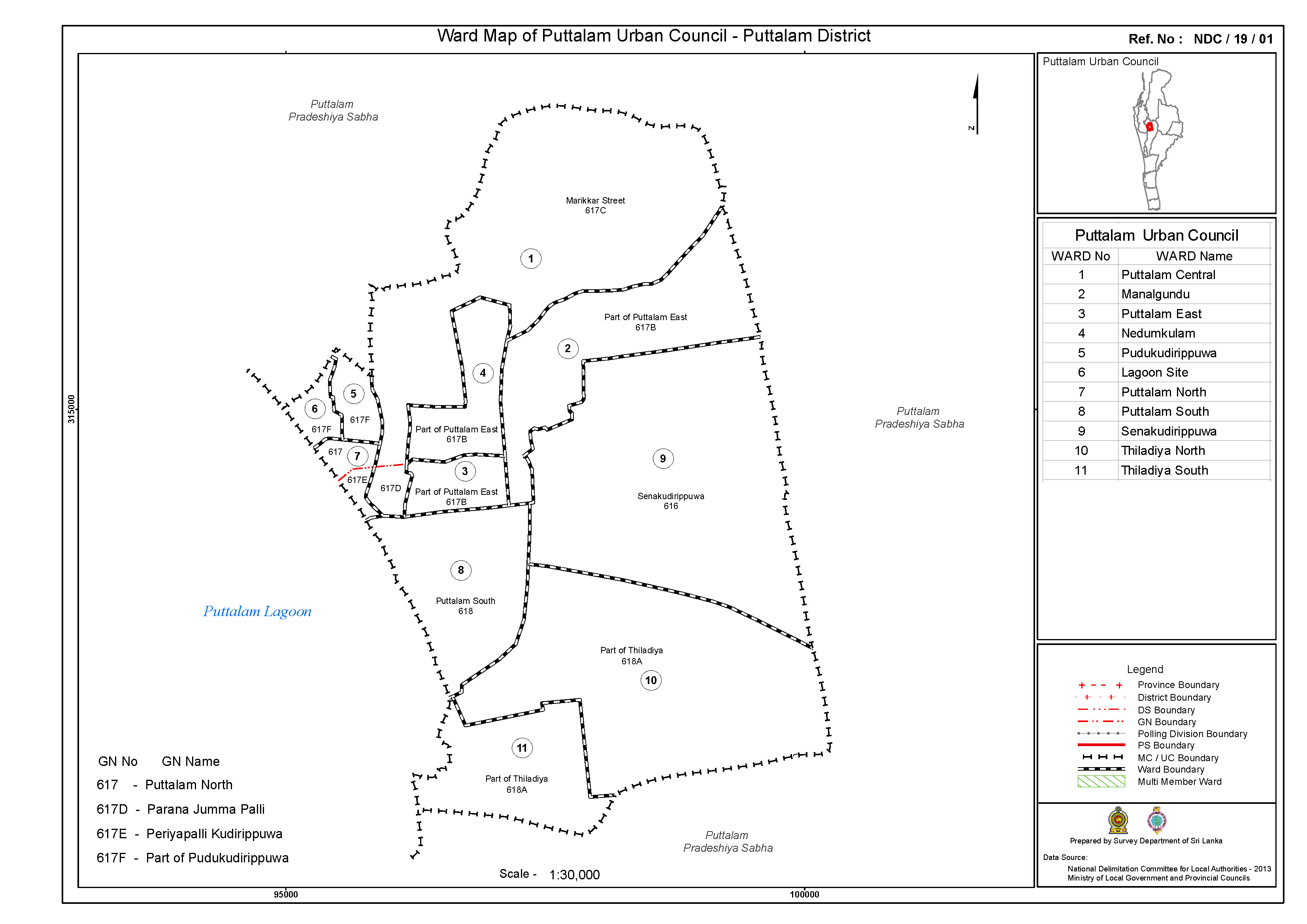
Ward Map of Puttalam Urban Council - Puttalam District Prepared by Survey Department of Sri Lanka

Grama Niladhari Division	Location Code of GND	Village Name
Attavilluwa	6-2-15-095	Attavilluwa Middle Class Land; Attawilluwa Cement Factory Quarters
Attavilluwa Central	6-2-15-110	Attawilluwa Central; Uttara Attawilluwa; Suhadagama; Akkarayaya; Middle Class Land
Bodhirajapura	6-2-15-090	Bodhirajapura
Chenaikudirippuwa	6-2-15-045	Chenaikudiruppuwa(Division No.03); Part of Josephvaz Mawatha; Mullai Nagar; Willuwa Watta; Arachchivilluwa; Baristar Uyana; Punchiwilluwa Watta; Maha Willuwa; Araliya Uyana; Jayabima; Sabastian Munipura; Abayapura; Baristarpura; Suwagama; A part of Samagi Mawatha; Christopher Estate
Kalladiya	6-2-15-085	Kalladiya; Sinhapura; Samagigama; Kiraloya; Agoda Kiraloya
Manalthivu	6-2-15-005	Manalthivu; Aliyaweli; Anaikutti; Mulliweli; Arivichchenei; Vilukkai; Weppamadu; Seguwanthivu; Semaveli North
Marikkar Street	6-2-15-025	Marikkar Street(Division No 05); Thambapanni; Part of Nedumkulam; Near the Pari Appa Mosque; Udayaweli; Vettukulam; Part of Chetty Street; Seththupallama; Seemaweli
Mullipuram	6-2-15-030	Mullipuram; Kurusadi; Pandavei; Vettalai; Kolany; Makkalpuram
Nelumwewa	6-2-15-020	Nelumwewa; Hasthipura; Pubudugama
Old Jumma Mosque	6-2-15-060	Kanganikkulam; Part of 2 & 3 Cross Street; Part of Chetty Street; Part of Marikkar Street; Part of Poles Road
Palavi	6-2-15-100	Palavi; Wanniyathivu; Thalgaskanda; Budhhigaminipura; Periyakulam South; Pachchakadumundel
Periyapalli Kudiruppuwa	6-2-15-070	1,2,3 Cross Street; Part of Kurunagala Road; Part of Mannar Road; Major Mosque Road; Part of Chetty Street; Sea Road; Part of Ibunu Badudha Road
Pottuvilluwa	6-2-15-105	Pottuvilluwa; Akkarakala; Nagavilluwa
Pudukudiruppuwa	6-2-15-035	Pudukudiruppuwa; Part of 6th Lane; Part of Ibunu Badudha Road; Part of Western Saltern Road; Part of Mannar Road; Part of Casim Lane; Sea Road; 12th Cross Street; 11th Cross Street; 10 th Cross Street; 9th Cross Street; Nagoor Mosque Road; Part of 5th Lane; Part of J.P. Lane
Puttalam East	6-2-15-040	Sawivapura; Thambapanni; Kadumayankulam; Kochchimadutharawa; Kadayakulam; Sembukulam; Nedumkulam; Alhasan Village; Manalgundru; Semmandaluwa
Puttalam North	6-2-15-065	Puttalam North; Part of Chettiveethi; Part of Mannar Street; 5th Cross Street; Part of J.P. Lane; Part of Casim Lane; 4th Cross Street; Part of 3rd Cross Street; North Road; Part of Ibunu Badudha Road
Puttalam South	6-2-15-055	Puttalam South(Division No 01); Good Shed Road; Service Road; Ananda Mawatha; A part of Colombo Road; Part of Outer Circle Road; Costa Mawatha; Jaya Mawatha; Part of Josephvaz Mawatha
Rathmalyaya	6-2-15-075	Rathmalyaya; Arafa Nagar; Hijrath Puram; Y.M.B.A.; Al Cassim City; Pankulam; Periyakulam South; Periyakulam; Adapanavillu
Sella Kandal	6-2-15-015	Sellakandal; Pandigala; Pahala Manaveriya; Ihala Manaveriya
Sirambiadiya	6-2-15-010	Sirambiadiya; Acar 07; Sinnanagawilluwa; Asirigama; Pahala Manaveriya; Ihala Manaveriya
Thammannagama	6-2-15-080	Thammannagama; Maduragama
Thilladiya	6-2-15-050	Thilladiya(Division No 02); Mill Road; A part of Kurunegala Road; Part of Colombo Road; Paramandaluwa; Anapulla Uththuwa; Madara Uyana; Nindeniya; Part of Outer Circle Road; Punchi Arachchiwillu
