= Agility Global =

Global industrial investment company

Agility Global PLC
- Type: Public company
- Traded as: ADX: AGILITY
- Industry: Logistics
- Headquarters: Abu Dhabi, United Arab Emirates
- Key people: Tarek Sultan (Chairman), Henadi Al-Saleh (Group Chief Executive Officer)
- Revenue: US$5.1 billion (2025)
- Total assets: US$13.4 billion (2025)
- Number of employees: 70,000+
- Website: agility.com

Agility Global PLC is a multi-business owner, operator, and long-term investor listed on the Abu Dhabi Securities Exchange. The company operates in more than 80 countries across six continents and employs more than 70,000 people.

Agility focuses on the logistics, transportation, and strategic infrastructure sectors. Its principal operating companies include Menzies Aviation, an aviation services provider; Tristar, a fuel logistics company; and Agility Logistics Parks, an industrial real estate platform operating in the Middle East, South Asia, and Africa. The company operates businesses in e-commerce logistics, remote-site services, and public-sector logistics.

Agility Global holds minority stakes in DSV , one of the world's largest freight forwarding and logistics companies, and the $1.3B Reem Mall in Abu Dhabi.

== History ==
In 2024, Agility Global PLC began trading on the Abu Dhabi Securities Exchange (ADX).

The company's stake in an aviation services business started in 2003, when National Aviation Services (NAS) began operating at a single airport in Kuwait and later expanded across emerging markets in the Middle East and Africa. In 2022, Agility acquired Menzies Aviation and combined it with NAS, creating one of the world's largest aviation services providers by geographic footprint. In 2025, Menzies Aviation expanded further through the acquisition of G2 Secure Staff, increasing its presence to 350 airports in 65 countries. In 2003, Agility acquired a stake in Tristar, a Dubai-based fuel logistics company founded in 1998.

Agility Logistics Parks (ALP) started in a single country in the Gulf and has since expanded across the Middle East, India, and Africa. In Saudi Arabia, ALP operates more than 1.5m sqm of warehousing across Riyadh, Dammam, and Jeddah. Its warehouses in Côte d'Ivoire and Riyadh were the first EDGE Advanced–certified logistics facilities in West Africa and the Middle East, respectively, designed to achieve at least 40% greater energy efficiency than conventional warehousing buildings.

Agility's stake in DSV stems from the 2021 sale of its Global Integrated Logistics (GIL) business to the Danish logistics company in an all-shares transaction. The GIL business had been built between 2003 and 2020 through more than 40 acquisitions, creating a network of over 550 offices in more than 100 countries. Following the transaction, Agility became one of DSV's largest shareholders and holds a stake of approximately 8%, as of end 2025.

Agility Global also owns a stake in Reem Mall, a retail and entertainment complex in Abu Dhabi that opened to visitors in 2023. The mall includes more than 400 stores, over 80 dining outlets, and attractions such as Snow Abu Dhabi, an indoor snow park.

== Operations ==
Agility Global owns and operates businesses across aviation services, fuel logistics, industrial real estate, and supply chain services.

Major operating subsidiaries include:

- Menzies Aviation
- Tristar
- Agility Logistics Parks

Other subsidiaries include:

- Alliad
- Agility Defense & Government Services
- Shipa
- Labco
- United Projects for Aviation Services Company (UPAC)
- MicroClear by Inspection & Control Services

== Financials ==
For the year ended 2025, Agility Global reported revenue of US$5.1 billion and EBIT of $557 million.

As of December 31, 2025, total assets stood at approximately $13.4 billion.

== Corporate structure ==
Agility Global PLC is listed on the Abu Dhabi Securities Exchange under the ticker symbol AGILITY.

== Sustainability ==
Agility Global reports on environmental, social, and governance (ESG) performance through periodic sustainability disclosures aligned with international reporting frameworks. The company's sustainability strategy focuses on reducing environmental impact and driving social and economic development in the communities where it operates.

Sustainability oversight is structured through a group-level framework that establishes overall priorities and reporting standards across the portfolio. Under this model, each operating business—including Menzies Aviation, Tristar, and Agility Logistics Parks (ALP)—develops its own sector-specific sustainability roadmap and implements initiatives tailored to the environmental and operational characteristics of its industry.

Agility reports that businesses representing more than 96% of its workforce and over 90% of its greenhouse-gas emissions have committed to achieving net-zero emissions by 2050 or earlier. The company has also reported reductions in greenhouse-gas emissions relative to its baseline year and has introduced initiatives related to renewable energy use, energy-efficient infrastructure, and resource conservation across its operating companies.

Agility's social programs focus on education, digital skilling and humanitarian relief. In 2024, the company reported reaching over 284,000 people through community investment and social impact programs, including initiatives supporting education, workforce skills development, and humanitarian partnerships.

Since 2006, Agility has been a member of the Logistics Emergency Team (LET), a partnership of major global logistics companies that supports the UN World Food Programme-led Logistics Cluster and has responded to more than 75 humanitarian emergencies across over 40 countries.
