= Puttalam =

Puttalam පුත්තලම புத்தளம்
- Town
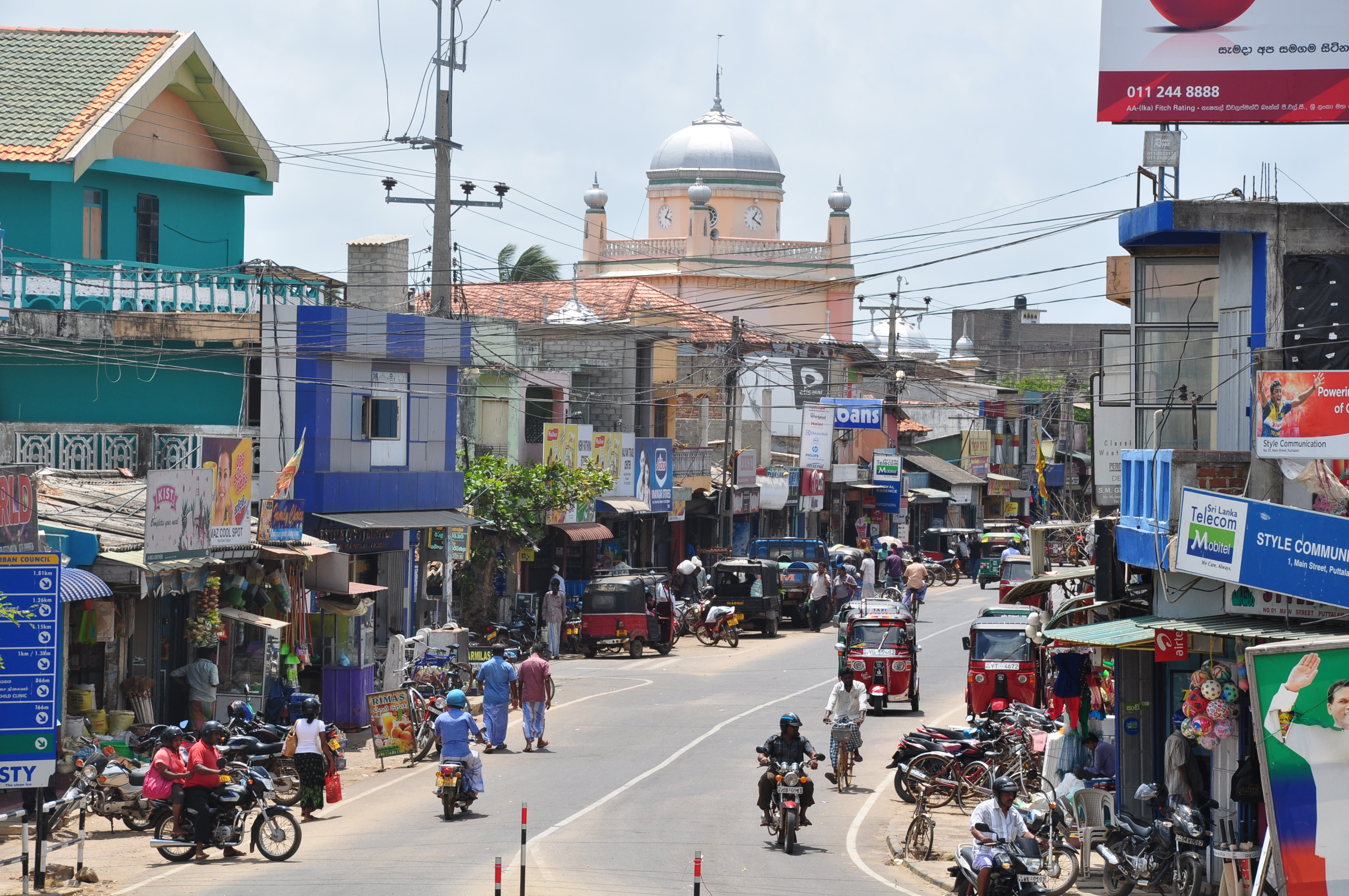

- Location within Sri Lanka
- Coordinates: 08°02′03″N 79°50′07″E
- Country: Sri Lanka
- Province: North Western
- District: Puttalam District
- Divisional Secretariat: Puttalam Division

Government
  - Type: Puttalam Municipal Council
  - Mayor: Vacant since May 2021

Area
  - Town: 25.6 km^{2} (9.9 sq mi)
  - Land: 119.0 km^{2} (45.9 sq mi)
  - Water: 327 km^{2} (126 sq mi)

Population (2012)
  - Town: 45,511 (Urban Council)
  - Density: 400/km^{2} (1,000/sq mi)
  - Urban density: 1,778/km^{2} (4,600/sq mi)
  - Metro: 82,443 (Puttalam Division)
  - Metro density: 471.1/km^{2} (1,220/sq mi)
- Time zone: UTC+05:30 (Sri Lanka Standard Time Zone)

Puttalam (Sinhala: පුත්තලම, romanized: Puttalama; Tamil: புத்தளம், romanized: Puttaḷam) is the largest town in Puttalam District, North Western Province, Sri Lanka. Puttalam is the administrative capital of the Puttalam District and governed by a municipal council.

== Climate ==
Under the Köppen climate classification, Pattalam has a tropical savanna climate (As) with a short dry season from June to September and a second dry season from January to March. The wet season is mainly from October to December. Temperatures remain steady throughout the year with little variations in between.

Climate data for Puttalam (1991–2020)
| Month | Jan | Feb | Mar | Apr | May | Jun | Jul | Aug | Sep | Oct | Nov | Dec | Year |
|---|---|---|---|---|---|---|---|---|---|---|---|---|---|
| Record high °C (°F) | 34.4 (93.9) | 36.4 (97.5) | 38.5 (101.3) | 38.5 (101.3) | 36.2 (97.2) | 35.4 (95.7) | 34.9 (94.8) | 35.5 (95.9) | 35.7 (96.3) | 35.5 (95.9) | 34.5 (94.1) | 33.1 (91.6) | 38.5 (101.3) |
| Mean daily maximum °C (°F) | 30.7 (87.3) | 32.3 (90.1) | 33.5 (92.3) | 33.2 (91.8) | 32.5 (90.5) | 31.7 (89.1) | 31.5 (88.7) | 31.7 (89.1) | 31.8 (89.2) | 31.3 (88.3) | 30.7 (87.3) | 30.0 (86.0) | 31.8 (89.2) |
| Daily mean °C (°F) | 26.2 (79.2) | 27.0 (80.6) | 28.6 (83.5) | 28.9 (84.0) | 29.5 (85.1) | 29.2 (84.6) | 28.9 (84.0) | 28.9 (84.0) | 28.9 (84.0) | 28.1 (82.6) | 27.1 (80.8) | 26.4 (79.5) | 28.1 (82.6) |
| Mean daily minimum °C (°F) | 21.4 (70.5) | 21.7 (71.1) | 23.4 (74.1) | 24.7 (76.5) | 26.5 (79.7) | 26.7 (80.1) | 26.3 (79.3) | 26.2 (79.2) | 25.9 (78.6) | 24.7 (76.5) | 23.5 (74.3) | 22.6 (72.7) | 24.5 (76.1) |
| Record low °C (°F) | 15.6 (60.1) | 16.2 (61.2) | 17.0 (62.6) | 20.5 (68.9) | 19.7 (67.5) | 22.7 (72.9) | 22.0 (71.6) | 22.5 (72.5) | 21.4 (70.5) | 21.3 (70.3) | 17.4 (63.3) | 15.7 (60.3) | 15.6 (60.1) |
| Average precipitation mm (inches) | 50.5 (1.99) | 42.1 (1.66) | 56.9 (2.24) | 154.4 (6.08) | 101.8 (4.01) | 32.1 (1.26) | 23.5 (0.93) | 23.3 (0.92) | 69.2 (2.72) | 230.6 (9.08) | 254.6 (10.02) | 143.7 (5.66) | 1,182.6 (46.56) |
| Average precipitation days (≥ 1.0 mm) | 5.6 | 4.2 | 4.5 | 9.5 | 6.5 | 4.2 | 2.1 | 3.4 | 5.8 | 12.8 | 15.3 | 10.8 | 84.7 |
Source: NOAA

== Points of interest ==
- Puttalam Lagoon
- Saltern
- Seguwantivu and Vidatamunai Wind Farms

== Energy ==
Seguwantivu Wind Power (Private) Limited, an Indian firm, invests US$37 million and maintains 25 wind turbines which produce 20 MWs of electricity in Puttalam Seguwantivu region.

== Religion ==
Puttalam is a multi-cultural and multi-religious town. Islam is the major religion in Puttalam town while Buddhists and Christians are significant minorities; there is also a small Hindu population.

Religion in Puttalam DS Division (2012)
| Population | Percent |
| Islam | 64.21% |
| Buddhist | 18.23% |
| Christian | 11.66% |
| Hindu | 5.89% |
| Others | 0.02% |

== Notable people ==
- Sahan Adeesha - cricketer born in Puttalam
- Abdul Baiz Kamardeen - politician, former Chairman of Puttalam Urban Council
- H. S. Ismail - 5th Speaker of the Parliament of Sri Lanka
- M. H. M. Naina Marikar - first elected to the Parliament of Sri Lanka as member for Puttalam
- M. H. M. Navavi - politician, former Member of Parliament
- Ali Sabri Raheem - politician, Member of Parliament
- Hector Appuhamy - politician, Member of Parliament
